

312001–312100 

|-bgcolor=#C2FFFF
| 312001 ||  || — || August 5, 2007 || 7300 Observatory || W. K. Y. Yeung || L4 || align=right | 13 km || 
|-id=002 bgcolor=#fefefe
| 312002 ||  || — || August 6, 2007 || Reedy Creek || J. Broughton || FLO || align=right data-sort-value="0.83" | 830 m || 
|-id=003 bgcolor=#fefefe
| 312003 ||  || — || August 8, 2007 || Socorro || LINEAR || — || align=right | 1.3 km || 
|-id=004 bgcolor=#FA8072
| 312004 ||  || — || August 14, 2007 || Siding Spring || SSS || PHO || align=right | 1.8 km || 
|-id=005 bgcolor=#fefefe
| 312005 ||  || — || August 8, 2007 || Socorro || LINEAR || — || align=right | 1.3 km || 
|-id=006 bgcolor=#fefefe
| 312006 ||  || — || August 8, 2007 || Socorro || LINEAR || — || align=right data-sort-value="0.75" | 750 m || 
|-id=007 bgcolor=#fefefe
| 312007 ||  || — || August 21, 2007 || Anderson Mesa || LONEOS || — || align=right | 1.1 km || 
|-id=008 bgcolor=#fefefe
| 312008 ||  || — || August 21, 2007 || Anderson Mesa || LONEOS || — || align=right data-sort-value="0.95" | 950 m || 
|-id=009 bgcolor=#fefefe
| 312009 ||  || — || August 22, 2007 || Anderson Mesa || LONEOS || FLO || align=right data-sort-value="0.83" | 830 m || 
|-id=010 bgcolor=#fefefe
| 312010 ||  || — || August 18, 2007 || Anderson Mesa || LONEOS || — || align=right data-sort-value="0.88" | 880 m || 
|-id=011 bgcolor=#fefefe
| 312011 ||  || — || September 3, 2007 || Catalina || CSS || NYS || align=right data-sort-value="0.63" | 630 m || 
|-id=012 bgcolor=#E9E9E9
| 312012 ||  || — || September 12, 2007 || Mount Lemmon || Mount Lemmon Survey || — || align=right | 1.8 km || 
|-id=013 bgcolor=#fefefe
| 312013 ||  || — || September 12, 2007 || Goodricke-Pigott || R. A. Tucker || — || align=right data-sort-value="0.92" | 920 m || 
|-id=014 bgcolor=#fefefe
| 312014 ||  || — || September 13, 2007 || Vicques || M. Ory || FLO || align=right data-sort-value="0.87" | 870 m || 
|-id=015 bgcolor=#fefefe
| 312015 ||  || — || September 4, 2007 || Catalina || CSS || — || align=right | 1.1 km || 
|-id=016 bgcolor=#fefefe
| 312016 ||  || — || September 6, 2007 || Anderson Mesa || LONEOS || — || align=right | 1.0 km || 
|-id=017 bgcolor=#fefefe
| 312017 ||  || — || September 8, 2007 || Anderson Mesa || LONEOS || — || align=right | 1.1 km || 
|-id=018 bgcolor=#fefefe
| 312018 ||  || — || September 9, 2007 || Kitt Peak || Spacewatch || V || align=right data-sort-value="0.65" | 650 m || 
|-id=019 bgcolor=#fefefe
| 312019 ||  || — || September 9, 2007 || Kitt Peak || Spacewatch || — || align=right data-sort-value="0.85" | 850 m || 
|-id=020 bgcolor=#fefefe
| 312020 ||  || — || September 9, 2007 || Mount Lemmon || Mount Lemmon Survey || — || align=right data-sort-value="0.98" | 980 m || 
|-id=021 bgcolor=#fefefe
| 312021 ||  || — || September 10, 2007 || Catalina || CSS || — || align=right data-sort-value="0.98" | 980 m || 
|-id=022 bgcolor=#fefefe
| 312022 ||  || — || September 10, 2007 || Kitt Peak || Spacewatch || MAS || align=right data-sort-value="0.86" | 860 m || 
|-id=023 bgcolor=#C2FFFF
| 312023 ||  || — || September 10, 2007 || Mount Lemmon || Mount Lemmon Survey || L4 || align=right | 9.5 km || 
|-id=024 bgcolor=#fefefe
| 312024 ||  || — || September 10, 2007 || Mount Lemmon || Mount Lemmon Survey || NYS || align=right data-sort-value="0.77" | 770 m || 
|-id=025 bgcolor=#fefefe
| 312025 ||  || — || September 10, 2007 || Kitt Peak || Spacewatch || V || align=right data-sort-value="0.78" | 780 m || 
|-id=026 bgcolor=#fefefe
| 312026 ||  || — || September 10, 2007 || Kitt Peak || Spacewatch || — || align=right | 1.2 km || 
|-id=027 bgcolor=#fefefe
| 312027 ||  || — || September 11, 2007 || Catalina || CSS || NYS || align=right data-sort-value="0.83" | 830 m || 
|-id=028 bgcolor=#fefefe
| 312028 ||  || — || September 11, 2007 || Purple Mountain || PMO NEO || EUT || align=right | 1.0 km || 
|-id=029 bgcolor=#fefefe
| 312029 ||  || — || September 12, 2007 || Catalina || CSS || V || align=right data-sort-value="0.87" | 870 m || 
|-id=030 bgcolor=#E9E9E9
| 312030 ||  || — || September 15, 2007 || Siding Spring || SSS || — || align=right | 2.0 km || 
|-id=031 bgcolor=#fefefe
| 312031 ||  || — || September 13, 2007 || Socorro || LINEAR || NYS || align=right data-sort-value="0.91" | 910 m || 
|-id=032 bgcolor=#fefefe
| 312032 ||  || — || September 13, 2007 || Socorro || LINEAR || FLO || align=right data-sort-value="0.77" | 770 m || 
|-id=033 bgcolor=#fefefe
| 312033 ||  || — || September 14, 2007 || Socorro || LINEAR || — || align=right data-sort-value="0.75" | 750 m || 
|-id=034 bgcolor=#fefefe
| 312034 ||  || — || September 14, 2007 || Socorro || LINEAR || — || align=right | 1.2 km || 
|-id=035 bgcolor=#fefefe
| 312035 ||  || — || September 10, 2007 || Kitt Peak || Spacewatch || — || align=right data-sort-value="0.71" | 710 m || 
|-id=036 bgcolor=#fefefe
| 312036 ||  || — || September 11, 2007 || Mount Lemmon || Mount Lemmon Survey || MAS || align=right data-sort-value="0.86" | 860 m || 
|-id=037 bgcolor=#fefefe
| 312037 ||  || — || September 10, 2007 || Kitt Peak || Spacewatch || — || align=right | 1.0 km || 
|-id=038 bgcolor=#fefefe
| 312038 ||  || — || September 10, 2007 || Kitt Peak || Spacewatch || — || align=right | 1.0 km || 
|-id=039 bgcolor=#fefefe
| 312039 ||  || — || September 11, 2007 || Mount Lemmon || Mount Lemmon Survey || — || align=right data-sort-value="0.68" | 680 m || 
|-id=040 bgcolor=#fefefe
| 312040 ||  || — || September 13, 2007 || Mount Lemmon || Mount Lemmon Survey || — || align=right data-sort-value="0.81" | 810 m || 
|-id=041 bgcolor=#fefefe
| 312041 ||  || — || September 10, 2007 || Kitt Peak || Spacewatch || — || align=right data-sort-value="0.88" | 880 m || 
|-id=042 bgcolor=#fefefe
| 312042 ||  || — || September 11, 2007 || Lulin Observatory || LUSS || — || align=right data-sort-value="0.96" | 960 m || 
|-id=043 bgcolor=#fefefe
| 312043 ||  || — || September 14, 2007 || Mount Lemmon || Mount Lemmon Survey || NYS || align=right data-sort-value="0.75" | 750 m || 
|-id=044 bgcolor=#fefefe
| 312044 ||  || — || September 11, 2007 || Purple Mountain || PMO NEO || FLO || align=right data-sort-value="0.85" | 850 m || 
|-id=045 bgcolor=#fefefe
| 312045 ||  || — || September 12, 2007 || Mount Lemmon || Mount Lemmon Survey || — || align=right data-sort-value="0.75" | 750 m || 
|-id=046 bgcolor=#fefefe
| 312046 ||  || — || September 14, 2007 || Catalina || CSS || V || align=right data-sort-value="0.84" | 840 m || 
|-id=047 bgcolor=#fefefe
| 312047 ||  || — || September 14, 2007 || Mount Lemmon || Mount Lemmon Survey || NYS || align=right data-sort-value="0.73" | 730 m || 
|-id=048 bgcolor=#fefefe
| 312048 ||  || — || September 13, 2007 || Socorro || LINEAR || MAS || align=right data-sort-value="0.67" | 670 m || 
|-id=049 bgcolor=#fefefe
| 312049 ||  || — || September 11, 2007 || Kitt Peak || Spacewatch || NYS || align=right data-sort-value="0.69" | 690 m || 
|-id=050 bgcolor=#fefefe
| 312050 ||  || — || September 12, 2007 || Catalina || CSS || — || align=right data-sort-value="0.81" | 810 m || 
|-id=051 bgcolor=#fefefe
| 312051 ||  || — || September 13, 2007 || Mount Lemmon || Mount Lemmon Survey || NYS || align=right data-sort-value="0.67" | 670 m || 
|-id=052 bgcolor=#fefefe
| 312052 ||  || — || September 5, 2007 || Catalina || CSS || — || align=right | 1.1 km || 
|-id=053 bgcolor=#fefefe
| 312053 ||  || — || September 9, 2007 || Kitt Peak || Spacewatch || NYS || align=right data-sort-value="0.77" | 770 m || 
|-id=054 bgcolor=#fefefe
| 312054 ||  || — || September 10, 2007 || Mount Lemmon || Mount Lemmon Survey || — || align=right data-sort-value="0.80" | 800 m || 
|-id=055 bgcolor=#fefefe
| 312055 ||  || — || September 12, 2007 || Catalina || CSS || — || align=right data-sort-value="0.87" | 870 m || 
|-id=056 bgcolor=#fefefe
| 312056 ||  || — || September 13, 2007 || Socorro || LINEAR || NYS || align=right data-sort-value="0.76" | 760 m || 
|-id=057 bgcolor=#fefefe
| 312057 ||  || — || September 14, 2007 || Mount Lemmon || Mount Lemmon Survey || — || align=right data-sort-value="0.77" | 770 m || 
|-id=058 bgcolor=#fefefe
| 312058 ||  || — || September 19, 2007 || Socorro || LINEAR || NYS || align=right data-sort-value="0.63" | 630 m || 
|-id=059 bgcolor=#E9E9E9
| 312059 ||  || — || September 25, 2007 || Mount Lemmon || Mount Lemmon Survey || — || align=right | 1.4 km || 
|-id=060 bgcolor=#fefefe
| 312060 ||  || — || September 30, 2007 || Kitt Peak || Spacewatch || NYS || align=right data-sort-value="0.68" | 680 m || 
|-id=061 bgcolor=#fefefe
| 312061 ||  || — || September 30, 2007 || Kitt Peak || Spacewatch || NYS || align=right data-sort-value="0.74" | 740 m || 
|-id=062 bgcolor=#fefefe
| 312062 ||  || — || September 19, 2007 || Kitt Peak || Spacewatch || — || align=right data-sort-value="0.85" | 850 m || 
|-id=063 bgcolor=#fefefe
| 312063 ||  || — || September 18, 2007 || Socorro || LINEAR || MAS || align=right data-sort-value="0.81" | 810 m || 
|-id=064 bgcolor=#fefefe
| 312064 ||  || — || September 25, 2007 || Mount Lemmon || Mount Lemmon Survey || V || align=right data-sort-value="0.80" | 800 m || 
|-id=065 bgcolor=#fefefe
| 312065 ||  || — || October 6, 2007 || Socorro || LINEAR || NYS || align=right data-sort-value="0.85" | 850 m || 
|-id=066 bgcolor=#fefefe
| 312066 ||  || — || October 6, 2007 || Socorro || LINEAR || MAS || align=right | 1.3 km || 
|-id=067 bgcolor=#fefefe
| 312067 ||  || — || October 6, 2007 || Socorro || LINEAR || — || align=right | 1.9 km || 
|-id=068 bgcolor=#fefefe
| 312068 ||  || — || October 3, 2007 || Needville || Needville Obs. || — || align=right data-sort-value="0.96" | 960 m || 
|-id=069 bgcolor=#fefefe
| 312069 ||  || — || October 8, 2007 || Goodricke-Pigott || R. A. Tucker || NYS || align=right data-sort-value="0.84" | 840 m || 
|-id=070 bgcolor=#FFC2E0
| 312070 ||  || — || October 9, 2007 || Siding Spring || SSS || ATEPHA || align=right data-sort-value="0.6" | 600 m || 
|-id=071 bgcolor=#fefefe
| 312071 ||  || — || October 8, 2007 || Kitt Peak || Spacewatch || — || align=right | 1.3 km || 
|-id=072 bgcolor=#fefefe
| 312072 ||  || — || October 8, 2007 || Kitt Peak || Spacewatch || MAS || align=right data-sort-value="0.73" | 730 m || 
|-id=073 bgcolor=#fefefe
| 312073 ||  || — || October 4, 2007 || Kitt Peak || Spacewatch || — || align=right data-sort-value="0.85" | 850 m || 
|-id=074 bgcolor=#fefefe
| 312074 ||  || — || October 6, 2007 || Kitt Peak || Spacewatch || MAS || align=right data-sort-value="0.87" | 870 m || 
|-id=075 bgcolor=#fefefe
| 312075 ||  || — || October 6, 2007 || Kitt Peak || Spacewatch || NYS || align=right data-sort-value="0.67" | 670 m || 
|-id=076 bgcolor=#fefefe
| 312076 ||  || — || October 6, 2007 || Kitt Peak || Spacewatch || NYS || align=right data-sort-value="0.82" | 820 m || 
|-id=077 bgcolor=#fefefe
| 312077 ||  || — || October 7, 2007 || Mount Lemmon || Mount Lemmon Survey || MAS || align=right data-sort-value="0.71" | 710 m || 
|-id=078 bgcolor=#fefefe
| 312078 ||  || — || October 7, 2007 || Catalina || CSS || — || align=right | 1.0 km || 
|-id=079 bgcolor=#fefefe
| 312079 ||  || — || October 4, 2007 || Kitt Peak || Spacewatch || NYS || align=right data-sort-value="0.84" | 840 m || 
|-id=080 bgcolor=#fefefe
| 312080 ||  || — || October 4, 2007 || Kitt Peak || Spacewatch || — || align=right data-sort-value="0.82" | 820 m || 
|-id=081 bgcolor=#fefefe
| 312081 ||  || — || October 6, 2007 || Kitt Peak || Spacewatch || — || align=right data-sort-value="0.90" | 900 m || 
|-id=082 bgcolor=#fefefe
| 312082 ||  || — || October 7, 2007 || Mount Lemmon || Mount Lemmon Survey || — || align=right data-sort-value="0.99" | 990 m || 
|-id=083 bgcolor=#fefefe
| 312083 ||  || — || October 4, 2007 || Catalina || CSS || NYS || align=right data-sort-value="0.76" | 760 m || 
|-id=084 bgcolor=#fefefe
| 312084 ||  || — || October 5, 2007 || Kitt Peak || Spacewatch || NYS || align=right data-sort-value="0.73" | 730 m || 
|-id=085 bgcolor=#fefefe
| 312085 ||  || — || October 5, 2007 || Kitt Peak || Spacewatch || FLO || align=right data-sort-value="0.93" | 930 m || 
|-id=086 bgcolor=#fefefe
| 312086 ||  || — || October 7, 2007 || Catalina || CSS || — || align=right | 1.5 km || 
|-id=087 bgcolor=#fefefe
| 312087 ||  || — || October 7, 2007 || Kitt Peak || Spacewatch || — || align=right data-sort-value="0.88" | 880 m || 
|-id=088 bgcolor=#fefefe
| 312088 ||  || — || October 8, 2007 || Anderson Mesa || LONEOS || NYS || align=right data-sort-value="0.81" | 810 m || 
|-id=089 bgcolor=#fefefe
| 312089 ||  || — || October 8, 2007 || Mount Lemmon || Mount Lemmon Survey || MAS || align=right data-sort-value="0.71" | 710 m || 
|-id=090 bgcolor=#fefefe
| 312090 ||  || — || October 8, 2007 || Kitt Peak || Spacewatch || — || align=right data-sort-value="0.80" | 800 m || 
|-id=091 bgcolor=#fefefe
| 312091 ||  || — || October 8, 2007 || Mount Lemmon || Mount Lemmon Survey || V || align=right data-sort-value="0.84" | 840 m || 
|-id=092 bgcolor=#fefefe
| 312092 ||  || — || October 7, 2007 || Mount Lemmon || Mount Lemmon Survey || NYS || align=right data-sort-value="0.74" | 740 m || 
|-id=093 bgcolor=#fefefe
| 312093 ||  || — || October 7, 2007 || Catalina || CSS || FLO || align=right data-sort-value="0.70" | 700 m || 
|-id=094 bgcolor=#fefefe
| 312094 ||  || — || October 7, 2007 || Mount Lemmon || Mount Lemmon Survey || — || align=right data-sort-value="0.88" | 880 m || 
|-id=095 bgcolor=#fefefe
| 312095 ||  || — || October 8, 2007 || Catalina || CSS || NYS || align=right data-sort-value="0.84" | 840 m || 
|-id=096 bgcolor=#fefefe
| 312096 ||  || — || October 6, 2007 || Kitt Peak || Spacewatch || V || align=right data-sort-value="0.85" | 850 m || 
|-id=097 bgcolor=#E9E9E9
| 312097 ||  || — || October 6, 2007 || Kitt Peak || Spacewatch || — || align=right | 1.7 km || 
|-id=098 bgcolor=#fefefe
| 312098 ||  || — || October 7, 2007 || Dauban || Chante-Perdrix Obs. || V || align=right data-sort-value="0.93" | 930 m || 
|-id=099 bgcolor=#fefefe
| 312099 ||  || — || December 20, 2004 || Mount Lemmon || Mount Lemmon Survey || MAS || align=right data-sort-value="0.80" | 800 m || 
|-id=100 bgcolor=#fefefe
| 312100 ||  || — || October 7, 2007 || Mount Lemmon || Mount Lemmon Survey || V || align=right data-sort-value="0.69" | 690 m || 
|}

312101–312200 

|-bgcolor=#fefefe
| 312101 ||  || — || October 7, 2007 || Mount Lemmon || Mount Lemmon Survey || MAS || align=right data-sort-value="0.80" | 800 m || 
|-id=102 bgcolor=#fefefe
| 312102 ||  || — || October 6, 2007 || Socorro || LINEAR || — || align=right data-sort-value="0.83" | 830 m || 
|-id=103 bgcolor=#fefefe
| 312103 ||  || — || October 7, 2007 || Socorro || LINEAR || — || align=right data-sort-value="0.98" | 980 m || 
|-id=104 bgcolor=#fefefe
| 312104 ||  || — || October 9, 2007 || Socorro || LINEAR || V || align=right data-sort-value="0.89" | 890 m || 
|-id=105 bgcolor=#fefefe
| 312105 ||  || — || October 9, 2007 || Socorro || LINEAR || — || align=right | 1.1 km || 
|-id=106 bgcolor=#fefefe
| 312106 ||  || — || October 9, 2007 || Socorro || LINEAR || FLO || align=right data-sort-value="0.88" | 880 m || 
|-id=107 bgcolor=#fefefe
| 312107 ||  || — || October 9, 2007 || Socorro || LINEAR || — || align=right | 1.1 km || 
|-id=108 bgcolor=#fefefe
| 312108 ||  || — || October 9, 2007 || Socorro || LINEAR || — || align=right data-sort-value="0.97" | 970 m || 
|-id=109 bgcolor=#fefefe
| 312109 ||  || — || October 9, 2007 || Socorro || LINEAR || — || align=right | 1.2 km || 
|-id=110 bgcolor=#fefefe
| 312110 ||  || — || October 11, 2007 || Socorro || LINEAR || — || align=right data-sort-value="0.66" | 660 m || 
|-id=111 bgcolor=#fefefe
| 312111 ||  || — || October 12, 2007 || Socorro || LINEAR || — || align=right | 1.0 km || 
|-id=112 bgcolor=#fefefe
| 312112 ||  || — || October 12, 2007 || Socorro || LINEAR || — || align=right | 1.1 km || 
|-id=113 bgcolor=#fefefe
| 312113 ||  || — || October 4, 2007 || Kitt Peak || Spacewatch || — || align=right data-sort-value="0.81" | 810 m || 
|-id=114 bgcolor=#fefefe
| 312114 ||  || — || October 6, 2007 || Kitt Peak || Spacewatch || — || align=right data-sort-value="0.81" | 810 m || 
|-id=115 bgcolor=#fefefe
| 312115 ||  || — || October 8, 2007 || Anderson Mesa || LONEOS || — || align=right data-sort-value="0.99" | 990 m || 
|-id=116 bgcolor=#fefefe
| 312116 ||  || — || October 6, 2007 || Kitt Peak || Spacewatch || NYScritical || align=right data-sort-value="0.58" | 580 m || 
|-id=117 bgcolor=#fefefe
| 312117 ||  || — || October 7, 2007 || Mount Lemmon || Mount Lemmon Survey || — || align=right data-sort-value="0.75" | 750 m || 
|-id=118 bgcolor=#fefefe
| 312118 ||  || — || October 8, 2007 || Mount Lemmon || Mount Lemmon Survey || NYS || align=right data-sort-value="0.83" | 830 m || 
|-id=119 bgcolor=#fefefe
| 312119 ||  || — || October 8, 2007 || Mount Lemmon || Mount Lemmon Survey || MAS || align=right data-sort-value="0.84" | 840 m || 
|-id=120 bgcolor=#fefefe
| 312120 ||  || — || October 7, 2007 || Kitt Peak || Spacewatch || — || align=right | 1.1 km || 
|-id=121 bgcolor=#fefefe
| 312121 ||  || — || October 8, 2007 || Mount Lemmon || Mount Lemmon Survey || EUT || align=right data-sort-value="0.65" | 650 m || 
|-id=122 bgcolor=#fefefe
| 312122 ||  || — || October 8, 2007 || Kitt Peak || Spacewatch || MAS || align=right data-sort-value="0.57" | 570 m || 
|-id=123 bgcolor=#fefefe
| 312123 ||  || — || October 8, 2007 || Kitt Peak || Spacewatch || NYS || align=right data-sort-value="0.66" | 660 m || 
|-id=124 bgcolor=#fefefe
| 312124 ||  || — || October 9, 2007 || Mount Lemmon || Mount Lemmon Survey || — || align=right data-sort-value="0.93" | 930 m || 
|-id=125 bgcolor=#fefefe
| 312125 ||  || — || October 9, 2007 || Purple Mountain || PMO NEO || V || align=right data-sort-value="0.83" | 830 m || 
|-id=126 bgcolor=#fefefe
| 312126 ||  || — || October 10, 2007 || Mount Lemmon || Mount Lemmon Survey || — || align=right data-sort-value="0.76" | 760 m || 
|-id=127 bgcolor=#E9E9E9
| 312127 ||  || — || October 9, 2007 || Catalina || CSS || JUN || align=right | 1.4 km || 
|-id=128 bgcolor=#fefefe
| 312128 ||  || — || October 11, 2007 || Kitt Peak || Spacewatch || V || align=right data-sort-value="0.83" | 830 m || 
|-id=129 bgcolor=#fefefe
| 312129 ||  || — || October 8, 2007 || Mount Lemmon || Mount Lemmon Survey || NYS || align=right data-sort-value="0.78" | 780 m || 
|-id=130 bgcolor=#fefefe
| 312130 ||  || — || October 10, 2007 || Kitt Peak || Spacewatch || — || align=right data-sort-value="0.95" | 950 m || 
|-id=131 bgcolor=#fefefe
| 312131 ||  || — || October 9, 2007 || Kitt Peak || Spacewatch || FLO || align=right data-sort-value="0.65" | 650 m || 
|-id=132 bgcolor=#fefefe
| 312132 ||  || — || October 9, 2007 || Kitt Peak || Spacewatch || — || align=right data-sort-value="0.70" | 700 m || 
|-id=133 bgcolor=#fefefe
| 312133 ||  || — || October 12, 2007 || Mount Lemmon || Mount Lemmon Survey || — || align=right | 1.00 km || 
|-id=134 bgcolor=#fefefe
| 312134 ||  || — || October 8, 2007 || Mount Lemmon || Mount Lemmon Survey || MAS || align=right data-sort-value="0.85" | 850 m || 
|-id=135 bgcolor=#fefefe
| 312135 ||  || — || October 9, 2007 || Anderson Mesa || LONEOS || — || align=right | 1.1 km || 
|-id=136 bgcolor=#fefefe
| 312136 ||  || — || October 11, 2007 || Catalina || CSS || V || align=right data-sort-value="0.87" | 870 m || 
|-id=137 bgcolor=#fefefe
| 312137 ||  || — || October 12, 2007 || Catalina || CSS || NYS || align=right data-sort-value="0.71" | 710 m || 
|-id=138 bgcolor=#fefefe
| 312138 ||  || — || October 10, 2007 || Purple Mountain || PMO NEO || — || align=right | 1.0 km || 
|-id=139 bgcolor=#fefefe
| 312139 ||  || — || October 12, 2007 || Kitt Peak || Spacewatch || V || align=right data-sort-value="0.80" | 800 m || 
|-id=140 bgcolor=#fefefe
| 312140 ||  || — || October 12, 2007 || Kitt Peak || Spacewatch || NYS || align=right data-sort-value="0.79" | 790 m || 
|-id=141 bgcolor=#fefefe
| 312141 ||  || — || October 12, 2007 || Kitt Peak || Spacewatch || MAS || align=right data-sort-value="0.62" | 620 m || 
|-id=142 bgcolor=#fefefe
| 312142 ||  || — || October 14, 2007 || Mount Lemmon || Mount Lemmon Survey || V || align=right data-sort-value="0.83" | 830 m || 
|-id=143 bgcolor=#fefefe
| 312143 ||  || — || October 9, 2007 || Kitt Peak || Spacewatch || — || align=right data-sort-value="0.93" | 930 m || 
|-id=144 bgcolor=#E9E9E9
| 312144 ||  || — || October 14, 2007 || Catalina || CSS || — || align=right | 2.1 km || 
|-id=145 bgcolor=#fefefe
| 312145 ||  || — || October 10, 2007 || Catalina || CSS || V || align=right data-sort-value="0.80" | 800 m || 
|-id=146 bgcolor=#E9E9E9
| 312146 ||  || — || October 14, 2007 || Mount Lemmon || Mount Lemmon Survey || — || align=right | 1.4 km || 
|-id=147 bgcolor=#fefefe
| 312147 ||  || — || October 14, 2007 || Catalina || CSS || V || align=right data-sort-value="0.84" | 840 m || 
|-id=148 bgcolor=#fefefe
| 312148 ||  || — || October 15, 2007 || Anderson Mesa || LONEOS || V || align=right data-sort-value="0.84" | 840 m || 
|-id=149 bgcolor=#fefefe
| 312149 ||  || — || October 15, 2007 || Anderson Mesa || LONEOS || V || align=right data-sort-value="0.85" | 850 m || 
|-id=150 bgcolor=#fefefe
| 312150 ||  || — || October 7, 2007 || Catalina || CSS || — || align=right | 1.1 km || 
|-id=151 bgcolor=#fefefe
| 312151 ||  || — || October 6, 2007 || Kitt Peak || Spacewatch || MAS || align=right data-sort-value="0.71" | 710 m || 
|-id=152 bgcolor=#E9E9E9
| 312152 ||  || — || October 15, 2007 || Mount Lemmon || Mount Lemmon Survey || — || align=right | 3.5 km || 
|-id=153 bgcolor=#fefefe
| 312153 ||  || — || October 15, 2007 || Kitt Peak || Spacewatch || — || align=right data-sort-value="0.99" | 990 m || 
|-id=154 bgcolor=#fefefe
| 312154 ||  || — || October 22, 2007 || Gnosca || S. Sposetti || MAS || align=right data-sort-value="0.89" | 890 m || 
|-id=155 bgcolor=#fefefe
| 312155 ||  || — || October 19, 2007 || Mount Lemmon || Mount Lemmon Survey || — || align=right data-sort-value="0.66" | 660 m || 
|-id=156 bgcolor=#fefefe
| 312156 ||  || — || December 29, 2000 || Kitt Peak || Spacewatch || SUL || align=right | 2.4 km || 
|-id=157 bgcolor=#fefefe
| 312157 ||  || — || October 16, 2007 || Kitt Peak || Spacewatch || NYS || align=right data-sort-value="0.76" | 760 m || 
|-id=158 bgcolor=#fefefe
| 312158 ||  || — || October 19, 2007 || Mount Lemmon || Mount Lemmon Survey || NYS || align=right data-sort-value="0.69" | 690 m || 
|-id=159 bgcolor=#fefefe
| 312159 ||  || — || October 19, 2007 || Catalina || CSS || FLO || align=right data-sort-value="0.97" | 970 m || 
|-id=160 bgcolor=#fefefe
| 312160 ||  || — || October 30, 2007 || Kitt Peak || Spacewatch || — || align=right data-sort-value="0.90" | 900 m || 
|-id=161 bgcolor=#fefefe
| 312161 ||  || — || October 30, 2007 || Catalina || CSS || — || align=right | 1.0 km || 
|-id=162 bgcolor=#fefefe
| 312162 ||  || — || October 30, 2007 || Kitt Peak || Spacewatch || NYS || align=right data-sort-value="0.71" | 710 m || 
|-id=163 bgcolor=#fefefe
| 312163 ||  || — || October 30, 2007 || Mount Lemmon || Mount Lemmon Survey || MAS || align=right data-sort-value="0.64" | 640 m || 
|-id=164 bgcolor=#fefefe
| 312164 ||  || — || October 30, 2007 || Mount Lemmon || Mount Lemmon Survey || — || align=right data-sort-value="0.98" | 980 m || 
|-id=165 bgcolor=#fefefe
| 312165 ||  || — || October 30, 2007 || Kitt Peak || Spacewatch || MAS || align=right data-sort-value="0.82" | 820 m || 
|-id=166 bgcolor=#fefefe
| 312166 ||  || — || October 30, 2007 || Kitt Peak || Spacewatch || NYS || align=right data-sort-value="0.77" | 770 m || 
|-id=167 bgcolor=#fefefe
| 312167 ||  || — || October 30, 2007 || Mount Lemmon || Mount Lemmon Survey || MAS || align=right data-sort-value="0.82" | 820 m || 
|-id=168 bgcolor=#fefefe
| 312168 ||  || — || October 30, 2007 || Kitt Peak || Spacewatch || MAS || align=right data-sort-value="0.63" | 630 m || 
|-id=169 bgcolor=#fefefe
| 312169 ||  || — || October 30, 2007 || Kitt Peak || Spacewatch || NYS || align=right data-sort-value="0.59" | 590 m || 
|-id=170 bgcolor=#fefefe
| 312170 ||  || — || October 31, 2007 || Kitt Peak || Spacewatch || V || align=right data-sort-value="0.77" | 770 m || 
|-id=171 bgcolor=#fefefe
| 312171 ||  || — || October 31, 2007 || Kitt Peak || Spacewatch || — || align=right data-sort-value="0.90" | 900 m || 
|-id=172 bgcolor=#fefefe
| 312172 ||  || — || October 30, 2007 || Catalina || CSS || — || align=right | 1.3 km || 
|-id=173 bgcolor=#fefefe
| 312173 ||  || — || October 16, 2007 || Mount Lemmon || Mount Lemmon Survey || — || align=right | 1.2 km || 
|-id=174 bgcolor=#fefefe
| 312174 ||  || — || October 30, 2007 || Kitt Peak || Spacewatch || V || align=right data-sort-value="0.76" | 760 m || 
|-id=175 bgcolor=#E9E9E9
| 312175 ||  || — || November 2, 2007 || Socorro || LINEAR || MAR || align=right | 1.5 km || 
|-id=176 bgcolor=#fefefe
| 312176 ||  || — || November 3, 2007 || Dauban || Chante-Perdrix Obs. || — || align=right | 1.2 km || 
|-id=177 bgcolor=#fefefe
| 312177 ||  || — || November 4, 2007 || 7300 || W. K. Y. Yeung || NYS || align=right data-sort-value="0.71" | 710 m || 
|-id=178 bgcolor=#fefefe
| 312178 ||  || — || November 5, 2007 || Eskridge || G. Hug || V || align=right data-sort-value="0.92" | 920 m || 
|-id=179 bgcolor=#fefefe
| 312179 ||  || — || November 5, 2007 || La Sagra || OAM Obs. || — || align=right | 1.3 km || 
|-id=180 bgcolor=#fefefe
| 312180 ||  || — || November 1, 2007 || Mount Lemmon || Mount Lemmon Survey || — || align=right data-sort-value="0.84" | 840 m || 
|-id=181 bgcolor=#fefefe
| 312181 ||  || — || November 2, 2007 || Mount Lemmon || Mount Lemmon Survey || — || align=right data-sort-value="0.93" | 930 m || 
|-id=182 bgcolor=#fefefe
| 312182 ||  || — || November 1, 2007 || Kitt Peak || Spacewatch || V || align=right data-sort-value="0.83" | 830 m || 
|-id=183 bgcolor=#fefefe
| 312183 ||  || — || November 1, 2007 || Kitt Peak || Spacewatch || V || align=right data-sort-value="0.76" | 760 m || 
|-id=184 bgcolor=#E9E9E9
| 312184 ||  || — || April 2, 2005 || Mount Lemmon || Mount Lemmon Survey || — || align=right | 1.1 km || 
|-id=185 bgcolor=#fefefe
| 312185 ||  || — || November 1, 2007 || Kitt Peak || Spacewatch || — || align=right data-sort-value="0.92" | 920 m || 
|-id=186 bgcolor=#fefefe
| 312186 ||  || — || November 1, 2007 || Kitt Peak || Spacewatch || — || align=right | 1.4 km || 
|-id=187 bgcolor=#fefefe
| 312187 ||  || — || November 2, 2007 || Purple Mountain || PMO NEO || — || align=right data-sort-value="0.98" | 980 m || 
|-id=188 bgcolor=#fefefe
| 312188 ||  || — || November 2, 2007 || Socorro || LINEAR || — || align=right | 1.1 km || 
|-id=189 bgcolor=#fefefe
| 312189 ||  || — || November 4, 2007 || Socorro || LINEAR || MAS || align=right data-sort-value="0.82" | 820 m || 
|-id=190 bgcolor=#fefefe
| 312190 ||  || — || November 7, 2007 || Socorro || LINEAR || — || align=right | 1.2 km || 
|-id=191 bgcolor=#fefefe
| 312191 ||  || — || November 9, 2007 || Bisei SG Center || BATTeRS || — || align=right data-sort-value="0.86" | 860 m || 
|-id=192 bgcolor=#fefefe
| 312192 ||  || — || November 3, 2007 || Kitt Peak || Spacewatch || MAS || align=right data-sort-value="0.90" | 900 m || 
|-id=193 bgcolor=#fefefe
| 312193 ||  || — || November 5, 2007 || Mount Lemmon || Mount Lemmon Survey || — || align=right data-sort-value="0.94" | 940 m || 
|-id=194 bgcolor=#fefefe
| 312194 ||  || — || November 4, 2007 || Kitt Peak || Spacewatch || — || align=right | 1.1 km || 
|-id=195 bgcolor=#fefefe
| 312195 ||  || — || November 5, 2007 || Kitt Peak || Spacewatch || — || align=right data-sort-value="0.98" | 980 m || 
|-id=196 bgcolor=#E9E9E9
| 312196 ||  || — || November 5, 2007 || Kitt Peak || Spacewatch || — || align=right | 1.2 km || 
|-id=197 bgcolor=#fefefe
| 312197 ||  || — || November 2, 2007 || Mount Lemmon || Mount Lemmon Survey || FLO || align=right data-sort-value="0.91" | 910 m || 
|-id=198 bgcolor=#fefefe
| 312198 ||  || — || November 12, 2007 || Catalina || CSS || — || align=right | 1.7 km || 
|-id=199 bgcolor=#E9E9E9
| 312199 ||  || — || November 8, 2007 || Mount Lemmon || Mount Lemmon Survey || — || align=right | 1.4 km || 
|-id=200 bgcolor=#E9E9E9
| 312200 ||  || — || November 11, 2007 || Mount Lemmon || Mount Lemmon Survey || — || align=right | 1.8 km || 
|}

312201–312300 

|-bgcolor=#fefefe
| 312201 ||  || — || November 12, 2007 || Catalina || CSS || — || align=right | 1.0 km || 
|-id=202 bgcolor=#fefefe
| 312202 ||  || — || November 12, 2007 || Mount Lemmon || Mount Lemmon Survey || FLO || align=right data-sort-value="0.77" | 770 m || 
|-id=203 bgcolor=#fefefe
| 312203 ||  || — || November 11, 2007 || Socorro || LINEAR || PHO || align=right | 1.8 km || 
|-id=204 bgcolor=#fefefe
| 312204 ||  || — || November 13, 2007 || Mount Lemmon || Mount Lemmon Survey || — || align=right | 1.2 km || 
|-id=205 bgcolor=#fefefe
| 312205 ||  || — || November 15, 2007 || Mount Lemmon || Mount Lemmon Survey || ERI || align=right | 1.8 km || 
|-id=206 bgcolor=#fefefe
| 312206 ||  || — || November 13, 2007 || Mount Lemmon || Mount Lemmon Survey || NYS || align=right data-sort-value="0.74" | 740 m || 
|-id=207 bgcolor=#fefefe
| 312207 ||  || — || November 15, 2007 || Socorro || LINEAR || NYS || align=right data-sort-value="0.70" | 700 m || 
|-id=208 bgcolor=#fefefe
| 312208 ||  || — || November 13, 2007 || Kitt Peak || Spacewatch || — || align=right data-sort-value="0.97" | 970 m || 
|-id=209 bgcolor=#fefefe
| 312209 ||  || — || November 14, 2007 || Kitt Peak || Spacewatch || MAS || align=right data-sort-value="0.87" | 870 m || 
|-id=210 bgcolor=#E9E9E9
| 312210 ||  || — || November 13, 2007 || Catalina || CSS || — || align=right | 1.1 km || 
|-id=211 bgcolor=#fefefe
| 312211 ||  || — || November 15, 2007 || Catalina || CSS || — || align=right | 1.4 km || 
|-id=212 bgcolor=#fefefe
| 312212 ||  || — || November 15, 2007 || Anderson Mesa || LONEOS || — || align=right | 1.0 km || 
|-id=213 bgcolor=#E9E9E9
| 312213 ||  || — || November 11, 2007 || Mount Lemmon || Mount Lemmon Survey || — || align=right | 1.4 km || 
|-id=214 bgcolor=#fefefe
| 312214 ||  || — || November 2, 2007 || Mount Lemmon || Mount Lemmon Survey || — || align=right | 1.0 km || 
|-id=215 bgcolor=#E9E9E9
| 312215 ||  || — || November 2, 2007 || Kitt Peak || Spacewatch || — || align=right | 1.1 km || 
|-id=216 bgcolor=#E9E9E9
| 312216 ||  || — || November 3, 2007 || Mount Lemmon || Mount Lemmon Survey || — || align=right | 1.3 km || 
|-id=217 bgcolor=#fefefe
| 312217 ||  || — || November 13, 2007 || Mount Lemmon || Mount Lemmon Survey || V || align=right data-sort-value="0.85" | 850 m || 
|-id=218 bgcolor=#fefefe
| 312218 ||  || — || November 1, 2007 || Kitt Peak || Spacewatch || — || align=right | 1.1 km || 
|-id=219 bgcolor=#fefefe
| 312219 ||  || — || November 13, 2007 || Catalina || CSS || — || align=right | 1.8 km || 
|-id=220 bgcolor=#fefefe
| 312220 ||  || — || November 17, 2007 || Dauban || Chante-Perdrix Obs. || NYS || align=right data-sort-value="0.62" | 620 m || 
|-id=221 bgcolor=#fefefe
| 312221 ||  || — || November 19, 2007 || Mount Lemmon || Mount Lemmon Survey || V || align=right data-sort-value="0.77" | 770 m || 
|-id=222 bgcolor=#fefefe
| 312222 ||  || — || November 17, 2007 || Mount Lemmon || Mount Lemmon Survey || — || align=right | 1.1 km || 
|-id=223 bgcolor=#fefefe
| 312223 ||  || — || November 30, 2007 || Pla D'Arguines || R. Ferrando || NYS || align=right data-sort-value="0.67" | 670 m || 
|-id=224 bgcolor=#fefefe
| 312224 ||  || — || November 17, 2007 || Kitt Peak || Spacewatch || V || align=right data-sort-value="0.90" | 900 m || 
|-id=225 bgcolor=#fefefe
| 312225 ||  || — || December 3, 2007 || Catalina || CSS || NYS || align=right data-sort-value="0.70" | 700 m || 
|-id=226 bgcolor=#fefefe
| 312226 ||  || — || December 5, 2007 || Pla D'Arguines || R. Ferrando || NYS || align=right data-sort-value="0.74" | 740 m || 
|-id=227 bgcolor=#E9E9E9
| 312227 ||  || — || December 13, 2007 || Socorro || LINEAR || — || align=right | 1.6 km || 
|-id=228 bgcolor=#fefefe
| 312228 ||  || — || December 15, 2007 || Kitt Peak || Spacewatch || NYS || align=right data-sort-value="0.76" | 760 m || 
|-id=229 bgcolor=#E9E9E9
| 312229 ||  || — || December 15, 2007 || Catalina || CSS || — || align=right | 1.7 km || 
|-id=230 bgcolor=#E9E9E9
| 312230 ||  || — || December 15, 2007 || Kitt Peak || Spacewatch || — || align=right data-sort-value="0.96" | 960 m || 
|-id=231 bgcolor=#E9E9E9
| 312231 ||  || — || December 6, 2007 || Cerro Burek || Alianza S4 Obs. || — || align=right | 3.2 km || 
|-id=232 bgcolor=#E9E9E9
| 312232 ||  || — || December 14, 2007 || Mount Lemmon || Mount Lemmon Survey || — || align=right | 2.7 km || 
|-id=233 bgcolor=#E9E9E9
| 312233 ||  || — || December 16, 2007 || Kitt Peak || Spacewatch || — || align=right | 1.1 km || 
|-id=234 bgcolor=#E9E9E9
| 312234 ||  || — || December 16, 2007 || Mount Lemmon || Mount Lemmon Survey || — || align=right | 2.2 km || 
|-id=235 bgcolor=#E9E9E9
| 312235 ||  || — || December 17, 2007 || Mount Lemmon || Mount Lemmon Survey || — || align=right | 1.2 km || 
|-id=236 bgcolor=#E9E9E9
| 312236 ||  || — || December 16, 2007 || Kitt Peak || Spacewatch || — || align=right | 1.1 km || 
|-id=237 bgcolor=#E9E9E9
| 312237 ||  || — || August 13, 2002 || Palomar || NEAT || — || align=right | 1.2 km || 
|-id=238 bgcolor=#E9E9E9
| 312238 ||  || — || December 18, 2007 || Mount Lemmon || Mount Lemmon Survey || — || align=right | 1.1 km || 
|-id=239 bgcolor=#E9E9E9
| 312239 ||  || — || December 18, 2007 || Anderson Mesa || LONEOS || JUN || align=right | 1.2 km || 
|-id=240 bgcolor=#E9E9E9
| 312240 ||  || — || December 18, 2007 || Kitt Peak || Spacewatch || — || align=right | 1.3 km || 
|-id=241 bgcolor=#E9E9E9
| 312241 ||  || — || December 28, 2007 || Kitt Peak || Spacewatch || — || align=right | 1.1 km || 
|-id=242 bgcolor=#E9E9E9
| 312242 ||  || — || December 30, 2007 || Mount Lemmon || Mount Lemmon Survey || — || align=right | 1.6 km || 
|-id=243 bgcolor=#E9E9E9
| 312243 ||  || — || December 30, 2007 || Catalina || CSS || — || align=right | 1.4 km || 
|-id=244 bgcolor=#E9E9E9
| 312244 ||  || — || December 30, 2007 || Catalina || CSS || — || align=right | 2.6 km || 
|-id=245 bgcolor=#fefefe
| 312245 ||  || — || December 28, 2007 || Kitt Peak || Spacewatch || MAS || align=right data-sort-value="0.75" | 750 m || 
|-id=246 bgcolor=#E9E9E9
| 312246 ||  || — || January 30, 2004 || Kitt Peak || Spacewatch || — || align=right | 1.5 km || 
|-id=247 bgcolor=#d6d6d6
| 312247 ||  || — || December 28, 2007 || Kitt Peak || Spacewatch || — || align=right | 3.6 km || 
|-id=248 bgcolor=#E9E9E9
| 312248 ||  || — || December 31, 2007 || La Sagra || OAM Obs. || — || align=right | 1.2 km || 
|-id=249 bgcolor=#E9E9E9
| 312249 ||  || — || December 29, 2007 || Lulin || LUSS || — || align=right | 1.4 km || 
|-id=250 bgcolor=#E9E9E9
| 312250 ||  || — || December 31, 2007 || Kitt Peak || Spacewatch || — || align=right data-sort-value="0.93" | 930 m || 
|-id=251 bgcolor=#E9E9E9
| 312251 ||  || — || January 1, 2008 || Kitt Peak || Spacewatch || — || align=right | 3.0 km || 
|-id=252 bgcolor=#E9E9E9
| 312252 ||  || — || January 1, 2008 || Kitt Peak || Spacewatch || — || align=right | 2.3 km || 
|-id=253 bgcolor=#E9E9E9
| 312253 ||  || — || January 1, 2008 || Catalina || CSS || EUN || align=right | 1.6 km || 
|-id=254 bgcolor=#E9E9E9
| 312254 ||  || — || January 3, 2008 || Eskridge || G. Hug || MAR || align=right | 1.4 km || 
|-id=255 bgcolor=#E9E9E9
| 312255 ||  || — || January 7, 2008 || Lulin || LUSS || WIT || align=right | 1.5 km || 
|-id=256 bgcolor=#fefefe
| 312256 ||  || — || January 10, 2008 || Mount Lemmon || Mount Lemmon Survey || — || align=right | 1.0 km || 
|-id=257 bgcolor=#E9E9E9
| 312257 ||  || — || January 10, 2008 || Mount Lemmon || Mount Lemmon Survey || — || align=right | 1.4 km || 
|-id=258 bgcolor=#E9E9E9
| 312258 ||  || — || January 10, 2008 || Mount Lemmon || Mount Lemmon Survey || — || align=right | 2.3 km || 
|-id=259 bgcolor=#E9E9E9
| 312259 ||  || — || January 10, 2008 || Mount Lemmon || Mount Lemmon Survey || — || align=right | 1.5 km || 
|-id=260 bgcolor=#E9E9E9
| 312260 ||  || — || January 10, 2008 || Mount Lemmon || Mount Lemmon Survey || CLO || align=right | 2.6 km || 
|-id=261 bgcolor=#E9E9E9
| 312261 ||  || — || January 10, 2008 || Mount Lemmon || Mount Lemmon Survey || — || align=right | 1.7 km || 
|-id=262 bgcolor=#E9E9E9
| 312262 ||  || — || January 10, 2008 || Mount Lemmon || Mount Lemmon Survey || — || align=right | 2.1 km || 
|-id=263 bgcolor=#E9E9E9
| 312263 ||  || — || January 10, 2008 || Mount Lemmon || Mount Lemmon Survey || EUN || align=right | 1.8 km || 
|-id=264 bgcolor=#E9E9E9
| 312264 ||  || — || January 10, 2008 || Mount Lemmon || Mount Lemmon Survey || XIZ || align=right | 1.5 km || 
|-id=265 bgcolor=#E9E9E9
| 312265 ||  || — || January 1, 2008 || Kitt Peak || Spacewatch || — || align=right | 1.4 km || 
|-id=266 bgcolor=#E9E9E9
| 312266 ||  || — || January 9, 2008 || Lulin || LUSS || — || align=right | 1.2 km || 
|-id=267 bgcolor=#E9E9E9
| 312267 ||  || — || January 10, 2008 || Kitt Peak || Spacewatch || — || align=right | 1.1 km || 
|-id=268 bgcolor=#E9E9E9
| 312268 ||  || — || January 10, 2008 || Mount Lemmon || Mount Lemmon Survey || — || align=right | 2.4 km || 
|-id=269 bgcolor=#E9E9E9
| 312269 ||  || — || January 11, 2008 || Mount Lemmon || Mount Lemmon Survey || — || align=right | 1.9 km || 
|-id=270 bgcolor=#E9E9E9
| 312270 ||  || — || January 13, 2008 || Kitt Peak || Spacewatch || — || align=right | 1.1 km || 
|-id=271 bgcolor=#E9E9E9
| 312271 ||  || — || January 13, 2008 || Kitt Peak || Spacewatch || — || align=right | 1.5 km || 
|-id=272 bgcolor=#E9E9E9
| 312272 ||  || — || January 14, 2008 || Kitt Peak || Spacewatch || — || align=right | 1.1 km || 
|-id=273 bgcolor=#E9E9E9
| 312273 ||  || — || January 14, 2008 || Kitt Peak || Spacewatch || — || align=right | 1.2 km || 
|-id=274 bgcolor=#E9E9E9
| 312274 ||  || — || January 15, 2008 || Mount Lemmon || Mount Lemmon Survey || — || align=right | 2.0 km || 
|-id=275 bgcolor=#E9E9E9
| 312275 ||  || — || January 15, 2008 || Kitt Peak || Spacewatch || RAF || align=right | 1.1 km || 
|-id=276 bgcolor=#E9E9E9
| 312276 ||  || — || January 15, 2008 || Kitt Peak || Spacewatch || — || align=right | 2.4 km || 
|-id=277 bgcolor=#E9E9E9
| 312277 ||  || — || January 15, 2008 || Kitt Peak || Spacewatch || — || align=right data-sort-value="0.94" | 940 m || 
|-id=278 bgcolor=#E9E9E9
| 312278 ||  || — || January 15, 2008 || Mount Lemmon || Mount Lemmon Survey || NEM || align=right | 2.7 km || 
|-id=279 bgcolor=#E9E9E9
| 312279 ||  || — || January 1, 2008 || Kitt Peak || Spacewatch || MAR || align=right | 1.2 km || 
|-id=280 bgcolor=#E9E9E9
| 312280 ||  || — || January 11, 2008 || Kitt Peak || Spacewatch || — || align=right data-sort-value="0.85" | 850 m || 
|-id=281 bgcolor=#E9E9E9
| 312281 ||  || — || January 14, 2008 || Kitt Peak || Spacewatch || — || align=right | 1.1 km || 
|-id=282 bgcolor=#E9E9E9
| 312282 ||  || — || January 1, 2008 || Mount Lemmon || Mount Lemmon Survey || — || align=right | 1.8 km || 
|-id=283 bgcolor=#E9E9E9
| 312283 ||  || — || January 19, 2008 || Kitt Peak || Spacewatch || — || align=right | 1.8 km || 
|-id=284 bgcolor=#E9E9E9
| 312284 ||  || — || January 28, 2008 || Lulin || LUSS || — || align=right | 1.3 km || 
|-id=285 bgcolor=#E9E9E9
| 312285 ||  || — || January 30, 2008 || Kitt Peak || Spacewatch || — || align=right | 1.9 km || 
|-id=286 bgcolor=#E9E9E9
| 312286 ||  || — || January 30, 2008 || Catalina || CSS || JUN || align=right | 1.6 km || 
|-id=287 bgcolor=#E9E9E9
| 312287 ||  || — || January 30, 2008 || Kitt Peak || Spacewatch || — || align=right | 1.7 km || 
|-id=288 bgcolor=#d6d6d6
| 312288 ||  || — || January 30, 2008 || Mount Lemmon || Mount Lemmon Survey || — || align=right | 3.4 km || 
|-id=289 bgcolor=#d6d6d6
| 312289 ||  || — || January 31, 2008 || Mount Lemmon || Mount Lemmon Survey || — || align=right | 3.1 km || 
|-id=290 bgcolor=#E9E9E9
| 312290 ||  || — || January 31, 2008 || Mount Lemmon || Mount Lemmon Survey || — || align=right | 1.5 km || 
|-id=291 bgcolor=#E9E9E9
| 312291 ||  || — || January 30, 2008 || Catalina || CSS || — || align=right | 1.2 km || 
|-id=292 bgcolor=#E9E9E9
| 312292 ||  || — || January 31, 2008 || Catalina || CSS || — || align=right | 4.0 km || 
|-id=293 bgcolor=#E9E9E9
| 312293 ||  || — || January 20, 2008 || Mount Lemmon || Mount Lemmon Survey || — || align=right | 3.3 km || 
|-id=294 bgcolor=#E9E9E9
| 312294 ||  || — || February 3, 2008 || Altschwendt || W. Ries || MAR || align=right | 1.3 km || 
|-id=295 bgcolor=#E9E9E9
| 312295 ||  || — || February 1, 2008 || La Sagra || OAM Obs. || — || align=right | 2.2 km || 
|-id=296 bgcolor=#E9E9E9
| 312296 ||  || — || February 2, 2008 || Kitt Peak || Spacewatch || AGN || align=right | 1.3 km || 
|-id=297 bgcolor=#E9E9E9
| 312297 ||  || — || February 3, 2008 || Kitt Peak || Spacewatch || MRX || align=right | 1.4 km || 
|-id=298 bgcolor=#E9E9E9
| 312298 ||  || — || February 3, 2008 || Kitt Peak || Spacewatch || — || align=right | 1.3 km || 
|-id=299 bgcolor=#E9E9E9
| 312299 ||  || — || February 4, 2008 || Purple Mountain || PMO NEO || — || align=right | 3.2 km || 
|-id=300 bgcolor=#E9E9E9
| 312300 ||  || — || February 2, 2008 || Kitt Peak || Spacewatch || GEF || align=right | 1.5 km || 
|}

312301–312400 

|-bgcolor=#E9E9E9
| 312301 ||  || — || February 2, 2008 || Kitt Peak || Spacewatch || MIS || align=right | 2.7 km || 
|-id=302 bgcolor=#E9E9E9
| 312302 ||  || — || February 6, 2008 || Catalina || CSS || — || align=right | 1.5 km || 
|-id=303 bgcolor=#E9E9E9
| 312303 ||  || — || February 6, 2008 || Anderson Mesa || LONEOS || — || align=right | 3.2 km || 
|-id=304 bgcolor=#E9E9E9
| 312304 ||  || — || February 7, 2008 || Kitt Peak || Spacewatch || — || align=right | 1.5 km || 
|-id=305 bgcolor=#E9E9E9
| 312305 ||  || — || February 7, 2008 || Catalina || CSS || — || align=right | 1.2 km || 
|-id=306 bgcolor=#E9E9E9
| 312306 ||  || — || February 8, 2008 || Catalina || CSS || — || align=right | 1.6 km || 
|-id=307 bgcolor=#E9E9E9
| 312307 ||  || — || February 8, 2008 || Mount Lemmon || Mount Lemmon Survey || — || align=right | 2.5 km || 
|-id=308 bgcolor=#E9E9E9
| 312308 ||  || — || February 8, 2008 || Mount Lemmon || Mount Lemmon Survey || — || align=right | 2.2 km || 
|-id=309 bgcolor=#E9E9E9
| 312309 ||  || — || February 3, 2008 || Socorro || LINEAR || — || align=right | 1.5 km || 
|-id=310 bgcolor=#E9E9E9
| 312310 ||  || — || February 6, 2008 || Socorro || LINEAR || — || align=right | 1.1 km || 
|-id=311 bgcolor=#E9E9E9
| 312311 ||  || — || February 9, 2008 || Catalina || CSS || — || align=right | 4.0 km || 
|-id=312 bgcolor=#E9E9E9
| 312312 ||  || — || February 7, 2008 || Kitt Peak || Spacewatch || — || align=right | 1.7 km || 
|-id=313 bgcolor=#E9E9E9
| 312313 ||  || — || February 7, 2008 || Mount Lemmon || Mount Lemmon Survey || — || align=right | 1.6 km || 
|-id=314 bgcolor=#E9E9E9
| 312314 ||  || — || February 7, 2008 || Kitt Peak || Spacewatch || — || align=right | 2.4 km || 
|-id=315 bgcolor=#E9E9E9
| 312315 ||  || — || February 7, 2008 || Mount Lemmon || Mount Lemmon Survey || — || align=right | 1.6 km || 
|-id=316 bgcolor=#E9E9E9
| 312316 ||  || — || February 9, 2008 || Needville || J. Dellinger, M. Eastman || — || align=right | 2.5 km || 
|-id=317 bgcolor=#E9E9E9
| 312317 ||  || — || February 11, 2008 || Dauban || F. Kugel || — || align=right | 1.8 km || 
|-id=318 bgcolor=#E9E9E9
| 312318 ||  || — || February 6, 2008 || Catalina || CSS || — || align=right | 3.6 km || 
|-id=319 bgcolor=#E9E9E9
| 312319 ||  || — || February 7, 2008 || Mount Lemmon || Mount Lemmon Survey || — || align=right | 1.7 km || 
|-id=320 bgcolor=#E9E9E9
| 312320 ||  || — || February 7, 2008 || Mount Lemmon || Mount Lemmon Survey || — || align=right | 2.1 km || 
|-id=321 bgcolor=#E9E9E9
| 312321 ||  || — || February 8, 2008 || Kitt Peak || Spacewatch || WIT || align=right data-sort-value="0.99" | 990 m || 
|-id=322 bgcolor=#E9E9E9
| 312322 ||  || — || February 8, 2008 || Kitt Peak || Spacewatch || AGN || align=right | 1.3 km || 
|-id=323 bgcolor=#E9E9E9
| 312323 ||  || — || February 8, 2008 || Mount Lemmon || Mount Lemmon Survey || — || align=right | 2.2 km || 
|-id=324 bgcolor=#E9E9E9
| 312324 ||  || — || February 8, 2008 || Kitt Peak || Spacewatch || — || align=right | 3.1 km || 
|-id=325 bgcolor=#E9E9E9
| 312325 ||  || — || February 9, 2008 || Kitt Peak || Spacewatch || — || align=right | 3.6 km || 
|-id=326 bgcolor=#d6d6d6
| 312326 ||  || — || February 9, 2008 || Mount Lemmon || Mount Lemmon Survey || — || align=right | 2.9 km || 
|-id=327 bgcolor=#E9E9E9
| 312327 ||  || — || February 9, 2008 || Catalina || CSS || — || align=right | 1.9 km || 
|-id=328 bgcolor=#d6d6d6
| 312328 ||  || — || February 9, 2008 || Kitt Peak || Spacewatch || — || align=right | 3.9 km || 
|-id=329 bgcolor=#E9E9E9
| 312329 ||  || — || February 10, 2008 || Catalina || CSS || — || align=right | 1.1 km || 
|-id=330 bgcolor=#E9E9E9
| 312330 ||  || — || February 12, 2008 || Mount Lemmon || Mount Lemmon Survey || — || align=right | 3.0 km || 
|-id=331 bgcolor=#E9E9E9
| 312331 ||  || — || February 13, 2008 || Kitt Peak || Spacewatch || — || align=right | 1.4 km || 
|-id=332 bgcolor=#E9E9E9
| 312332 ||  || — || February 8, 2008 || Socorro || LINEAR || — || align=right | 2.5 km || 
|-id=333 bgcolor=#E9E9E9
| 312333 ||  || — || February 9, 2008 || Socorro || LINEAR || HNS || align=right | 1.7 km || 
|-id=334 bgcolor=#E9E9E9
| 312334 ||  || — || October 5, 2002 || Palomar || NEAT || — || align=right | 1.6 km || 
|-id=335 bgcolor=#d6d6d6
| 312335 ||  || — || February 7, 2008 || Catalina || CSS || — || align=right | 4.1 km || 
|-id=336 bgcolor=#E9E9E9
| 312336 ||  || — || February 11, 2008 || Mount Lemmon || Mount Lemmon Survey || — || align=right | 1.4 km || 
|-id=337 bgcolor=#E9E9E9
| 312337 ||  || — || February 11, 2008 || Črni Vrh || Črni Vrh || BAR || align=right | 1.4 km || 
|-id=338 bgcolor=#E9E9E9
| 312338 ||  || — || February 2, 2008 || Kitt Peak || Spacewatch || — || align=right | 1.3 km || 
|-id=339 bgcolor=#E9E9E9
| 312339 ||  || — || February 2, 2008 || Kitt Peak || Spacewatch || — || align=right | 2.5 km || 
|-id=340 bgcolor=#E9E9E9
| 312340 ||  || — || February 1, 2008 || Kitt Peak || Spacewatch || — || align=right | 1.7 km || 
|-id=341 bgcolor=#E9E9E9
| 312341 ||  || — || February 2, 2008 || Kitt Peak || Spacewatch || HOF || align=right | 2.5 km || 
|-id=342 bgcolor=#d6d6d6
| 312342 ||  || — || February 8, 2008 || Mount Lemmon || Mount Lemmon Survey || — || align=right | 3.2 km || 
|-id=343 bgcolor=#E9E9E9
| 312343 ||  || — || February 9, 2008 || Mount Lemmon || Mount Lemmon Survey || — || align=right | 1.6 km || 
|-id=344 bgcolor=#E9E9E9
| 312344 ||  || — || February 12, 2008 || Kitt Peak || Spacewatch || WIT || align=right | 1.3 km || 
|-id=345 bgcolor=#E9E9E9
| 312345 ||  || — || February 24, 2008 || Kitt Peak || Spacewatch || — || align=right | 1.6 km || 
|-id=346 bgcolor=#E9E9E9
| 312346 ||  || — || February 24, 2008 || Kitt Peak || Spacewatch || — || align=right | 1.6 km || 
|-id=347 bgcolor=#E9E9E9
| 312347 ||  || — || February 24, 2008 || Kitt Peak || Spacewatch || WIT || align=right | 1.1 km || 
|-id=348 bgcolor=#E9E9E9
| 312348 ||  || — || February 24, 2008 || Mount Lemmon || Mount Lemmon Survey || — || align=right | 2.4 km || 
|-id=349 bgcolor=#E9E9E9
| 312349 ||  || — || February 26, 2008 || Piszkéstető || K. Sárneczky || — || align=right | 3.3 km || 
|-id=350 bgcolor=#E9E9E9
| 312350 ||  || — || February 26, 2008 || Mount Lemmon || Mount Lemmon Survey || — || align=right | 2.8 km || 
|-id=351 bgcolor=#d6d6d6
| 312351 ||  || — || February 27, 2008 || Kitt Peak || Spacewatch || — || align=right | 3.0 km || 
|-id=352 bgcolor=#E9E9E9
| 312352 ||  || — || February 27, 2008 || Catalina || CSS || — || align=right | 1.3 km || 
|-id=353 bgcolor=#E9E9E9
| 312353 ||  || — || February 28, 2008 || Mount Lemmon || Mount Lemmon Survey || AGN || align=right | 1.2 km || 
|-id=354 bgcolor=#E9E9E9
| 312354 ||  || — || February 29, 2008 || Grove Creek || F. Tozzi || — || align=right | 2.7 km || 
|-id=355 bgcolor=#E9E9E9
| 312355 ||  || — || February 29, 2008 || Grove Creek || F. Tozzi || — || align=right | 2.2 km || 
|-id=356 bgcolor=#E9E9E9
| 312356 ||  || — || February 27, 2008 || Kitt Peak || Spacewatch || — || align=right | 1.9 km || 
|-id=357 bgcolor=#E9E9E9
| 312357 ||  || — || February 28, 2008 || Catalina || CSS || — || align=right | 3.4 km || 
|-id=358 bgcolor=#E9E9E9
| 312358 ||  || — || February 28, 2008 || Mount Lemmon || Mount Lemmon Survey || — || align=right | 3.0 km || 
|-id=359 bgcolor=#E9E9E9
| 312359 ||  || — || February 28, 2008 || Kitt Peak || Spacewatch || — || align=right | 2.7 km || 
|-id=360 bgcolor=#E9E9E9
| 312360 ||  || — || February 28, 2008 || Kitt Peak || Spacewatch || — || align=right | 1.6 km || 
|-id=361 bgcolor=#E9E9E9
| 312361 ||  || — || February 28, 2008 || Catalina || CSS || JUN || align=right | 1.4 km || 
|-id=362 bgcolor=#E9E9E9
| 312362 ||  || — || February 27, 2008 || Mount Lemmon || Mount Lemmon Survey || — || align=right | 2.9 km || 
|-id=363 bgcolor=#d6d6d6
| 312363 ||  || — || February 28, 2008 || Mount Lemmon || Mount Lemmon Survey || — || align=right | 2.5 km || 
|-id=364 bgcolor=#E9E9E9
| 312364 ||  || — || February 26, 2008 || Mount Lemmon || Mount Lemmon Survey || NEM || align=right | 2.2 km || 
|-id=365 bgcolor=#d6d6d6
| 312365 ||  || — || February 27, 2008 || Mount Lemmon || Mount Lemmon Survey || — || align=right | 3.1 km || 
|-id=366 bgcolor=#E9E9E9
| 312366 ||  || — || February 18, 2008 || Mount Lemmon || Mount Lemmon Survey || — || align=right | 3.0 km || 
|-id=367 bgcolor=#E9E9E9
| 312367 ||  || — || February 28, 2008 || Mount Lemmon || Mount Lemmon Survey || AGN || align=right | 1.7 km || 
|-id=368 bgcolor=#d6d6d6
| 312368 ||  || — || March 2, 2008 || Purple Mountain || PMO NEO || — || align=right | 4.4 km || 
|-id=369 bgcolor=#E9E9E9
| 312369 ||  || — || March 2, 2008 || Socorro || LINEAR || — || align=right | 2.4 km || 
|-id=370 bgcolor=#d6d6d6
| 312370 ||  || — || March 6, 2008 || Altschwendt || W. Ries || EOS || align=right | 2.0 km || 
|-id=371 bgcolor=#d6d6d6
| 312371 ||  || — || March 1, 2008 || Kitt Peak || Spacewatch || — || align=right | 2.9 km || 
|-id=372 bgcolor=#E9E9E9
| 312372 ||  || — || March 2, 2008 || Mount Lemmon || Mount Lemmon Survey || — || align=right | 2.9 km || 
|-id=373 bgcolor=#d6d6d6
| 312373 ||  || — || March 3, 2008 || Catalina || CSS || — || align=right | 3.6 km || 
|-id=374 bgcolor=#d6d6d6
| 312374 ||  || — || March 4, 2008 || Mount Lemmon || Mount Lemmon Survey || — || align=right | 3.8 km || 
|-id=375 bgcolor=#E9E9E9
| 312375 ||  || — || March 4, 2008 || Kitt Peak || Spacewatch || WIT || align=right | 1.2 km || 
|-id=376 bgcolor=#E9E9E9
| 312376 ||  || — || March 5, 2008 || Kitt Peak || Spacewatch || XIZ || align=right | 1.5 km || 
|-id=377 bgcolor=#E9E9E9
| 312377 ||  || — || March 6, 2008 || Kitt Peak || Spacewatch || — || align=right | 1.9 km || 
|-id=378 bgcolor=#d6d6d6
| 312378 ||  || — || April 13, 1994 || Kitt Peak || Spacewatch || KOR || align=right | 1.5 km || 
|-id=379 bgcolor=#E9E9E9
| 312379 ||  || — || March 10, 2008 || Bisei SG Center || BATTeRS || — || align=right | 1.6 km || 
|-id=380 bgcolor=#E9E9E9
| 312380 ||  || — || March 4, 2008 || Purple Mountain || PMO NEO || — || align=right | 3.2 km || 
|-id=381 bgcolor=#E9E9E9
| 312381 ||  || — || March 7, 2008 || Kitt Peak || Spacewatch || — || align=right | 2.6 km || 
|-id=382 bgcolor=#E9E9E9
| 312382 ||  || — || March 8, 2008 || Socorro || LINEAR || — || align=right | 2.0 km || 
|-id=383 bgcolor=#d6d6d6
| 312383 ||  || — || March 6, 2008 || Catalina || CSS || EOS || align=right | 2.6 km || 
|-id=384 bgcolor=#d6d6d6
| 312384 ||  || — || March 8, 2008 || Kitt Peak || Spacewatch || KOR || align=right | 1.4 km || 
|-id=385 bgcolor=#E9E9E9
| 312385 ||  || — || March 9, 2008 || Kitt Peak || Spacewatch || — || align=right | 1.8 km || 
|-id=386 bgcolor=#E9E9E9
| 312386 ||  || — || March 11, 2008 || Kitt Peak || Spacewatch || — || align=right | 2.7 km || 
|-id=387 bgcolor=#d6d6d6
| 312387 ||  || — || March 11, 2008 || Kitt Peak || Spacewatch || EOS || align=right | 2.2 km || 
|-id=388 bgcolor=#E9E9E9
| 312388 ||  || — || March 12, 2008 || Kitt Peak || Spacewatch || AGN || align=right | 1.4 km || 
|-id=389 bgcolor=#d6d6d6
| 312389 ||  || — || March 12, 2008 || Kitt Peak || Spacewatch || TEL || align=right | 1.5 km || 
|-id=390 bgcolor=#E9E9E9
| 312390 ||  || — || March 1, 2008 || Kitt Peak || Spacewatch || WIT || align=right | 1.2 km || 
|-id=391 bgcolor=#E9E9E9
| 312391 ||  || — || March 8, 2008 || Mount Lemmon || Mount Lemmon Survey || — || align=right | 2.2 km || 
|-id=392 bgcolor=#E9E9E9
| 312392 ||  || — || March 6, 2008 || Mount Lemmon || Mount Lemmon Survey || — || align=right | 2.7 km || 
|-id=393 bgcolor=#d6d6d6
| 312393 ||  || — || March 11, 2008 || Mount Lemmon || Mount Lemmon Survey || — || align=right | 4.2 km || 
|-id=394 bgcolor=#d6d6d6
| 312394 ||  || — || March 2, 2008 || Mount Lemmon || Mount Lemmon Survey || EOS || align=right | 5.6 km || 
|-id=395 bgcolor=#E9E9E9
| 312395 ||  || — || March 6, 2008 || Catalina || CSS || GEF || align=right | 1.7 km || 
|-id=396 bgcolor=#E9E9E9
| 312396 ||  || — || March 8, 2008 || Socorro || LINEAR || — || align=right | 3.8 km || 
|-id=397 bgcolor=#d6d6d6
| 312397 ||  || — || March 25, 2008 || Kitt Peak || Spacewatch || — || align=right | 3.5 km || 
|-id=398 bgcolor=#d6d6d6
| 312398 ||  || — || March 26, 2008 || Mount Lemmon || Mount Lemmon Survey || — || align=right | 2.7 km || 
|-id=399 bgcolor=#d6d6d6
| 312399 ||  || — || March 26, 2008 || Mount Lemmon || Mount Lemmon Survey || — || align=right | 6.3 km || 
|-id=400 bgcolor=#d6d6d6
| 312400 ||  || — || March 27, 2008 || Kitt Peak || Spacewatch || — || align=right | 4.0 km || 
|}

312401–312500 

|-bgcolor=#d6d6d6
| 312401 ||  || — || March 28, 2008 || Kitt Peak || Spacewatch || THM || align=right | 2.4 km || 
|-id=402 bgcolor=#d6d6d6
| 312402 ||  || — || March 28, 2008 || Mount Lemmon || Mount Lemmon Survey || — || align=right | 4.0 km || 
|-id=403 bgcolor=#d6d6d6
| 312403 ||  || — || March 28, 2008 || Mount Lemmon || Mount Lemmon Survey || — || align=right | 2.7 km || 
|-id=404 bgcolor=#d6d6d6
| 312404 ||  || — || March 28, 2008 || Mount Lemmon || Mount Lemmon Survey || THM || align=right | 2.3 km || 
|-id=405 bgcolor=#E9E9E9
| 312405 ||  || — || March 28, 2008 || Mount Lemmon || Mount Lemmon Survey || — || align=right | 2.8 km || 
|-id=406 bgcolor=#E9E9E9
| 312406 ||  || — || March 28, 2008 || Kitt Peak || Spacewatch || — || align=right | 2.0 km || 
|-id=407 bgcolor=#d6d6d6
| 312407 ||  || — || March 28, 2008 || Mount Lemmon || Mount Lemmon Survey || — || align=right | 2.6 km || 
|-id=408 bgcolor=#d6d6d6
| 312408 ||  || — || March 5, 2008 || Mount Lemmon || Mount Lemmon Survey || — || align=right | 3.2 km || 
|-id=409 bgcolor=#d6d6d6
| 312409 ||  || — || March 31, 2008 || Mount Lemmon || Mount Lemmon Survey || — || align=right | 3.2 km || 
|-id=410 bgcolor=#E9E9E9
| 312410 ||  || — || March 29, 2008 || Mount Lemmon || Mount Lemmon Survey || — || align=right | 1.7 km || 
|-id=411 bgcolor=#d6d6d6
| 312411 ||  || — || March 30, 2008 || Kitt Peak || Spacewatch || ALA || align=right | 3.9 km || 
|-id=412 bgcolor=#d6d6d6
| 312412 ||  || — || April 7, 2003 || Kitt Peak || Spacewatch || CHA || align=right | 2.2 km || 
|-id=413 bgcolor=#d6d6d6
| 312413 ||  || — || March 31, 2008 || Kitt Peak || Spacewatch || — || align=right | 3.0 km || 
|-id=414 bgcolor=#d6d6d6
| 312414 ||  || — || March 31, 2008 || Kitt Peak || Spacewatch || — || align=right | 3.1 km || 
|-id=415 bgcolor=#E9E9E9
| 312415 ||  || — || April 1, 2008 || Kitt Peak || Spacewatch || — || align=right | 2.0 km || 
|-id=416 bgcolor=#d6d6d6
| 312416 ||  || — || April 1, 2008 || Kitt Peak || Spacewatch || HYG || align=right | 2.6 km || 
|-id=417 bgcolor=#d6d6d6
| 312417 ||  || — || April 1, 2008 || Kitt Peak || Spacewatch || — || align=right | 3.0 km || 
|-id=418 bgcolor=#E9E9E9
| 312418 ||  || — || April 1, 2008 || Mount Lemmon || Mount Lemmon Survey || CLO || align=right | 2.6 km || 
|-id=419 bgcolor=#d6d6d6
| 312419 ||  || — || September 24, 2005 || Anderson Mesa || LONEOS || — || align=right | 4.3 km || 
|-id=420 bgcolor=#d6d6d6
| 312420 ||  || — || April 1, 2008 || Catalina || CSS || TIR || align=right | 4.4 km || 
|-id=421 bgcolor=#d6d6d6
| 312421 ||  || — || April 3, 2008 || Kitt Peak || Spacewatch || EOS || align=right | 2.2 km || 
|-id=422 bgcolor=#d6d6d6
| 312422 ||  || — || April 5, 2008 || Kitt Peak || Spacewatch || MRC || align=right | 4.0 km || 
|-id=423 bgcolor=#E9E9E9
| 312423 ||  || — || April 5, 2008 || Catalina || CSS || ADE || align=right | 3.0 km || 
|-id=424 bgcolor=#d6d6d6
| 312424 ||  || — || April 5, 2008 || Catalina || CSS || — || align=right | 3.1 km || 
|-id=425 bgcolor=#d6d6d6
| 312425 ||  || — || March 4, 2008 || Mount Lemmon || Mount Lemmon Survey || — || align=right | 3.4 km || 
|-id=426 bgcolor=#d6d6d6
| 312426 ||  || — || April 6, 2008 || Mount Lemmon || Mount Lemmon Survey || EOS || align=right | 2.1 km || 
|-id=427 bgcolor=#d6d6d6
| 312427 ||  || — || April 7, 2008 || Kitt Peak || Spacewatch || — || align=right | 2.8 km || 
|-id=428 bgcolor=#d6d6d6
| 312428 ||  || — || April 8, 2008 || Kitt Peak || Spacewatch || — || align=right | 3.4 km || 
|-id=429 bgcolor=#d6d6d6
| 312429 ||  || — || April 3, 2008 || Catalina || CSS || EUP || align=right | 5.8 km || 
|-id=430 bgcolor=#d6d6d6
| 312430 ||  || — || April 11, 2008 || Kitt Peak || Spacewatch || — || align=right | 3.9 km || 
|-id=431 bgcolor=#E9E9E9
| 312431 ||  || — || April 13, 2008 || Mount Lemmon || Mount Lemmon Survey || HOF || align=right | 3.3 km || 
|-id=432 bgcolor=#E9E9E9
| 312432 ||  || — || April 6, 2008 || Mount Lemmon || Mount Lemmon Survey || — || align=right | 1.9 km || 
|-id=433 bgcolor=#d6d6d6
| 312433 ||  || — || April 1, 2008 || Kitt Peak || Spacewatch || — || align=right | 3.9 km || 
|-id=434 bgcolor=#d6d6d6
| 312434 ||  || — || April 26, 2008 || Kitt Peak || Spacewatch || — || align=right | 4.7 km || 
|-id=435 bgcolor=#d6d6d6
| 312435 ||  || — || April 26, 2008 || Mount Lemmon || Mount Lemmon Survey || — || align=right | 3.3 km || 
|-id=436 bgcolor=#E9E9E9
| 312436 ||  || — || April 26, 2008 || Catalina || CSS || — || align=right | 2.7 km || 
|-id=437 bgcolor=#E9E9E9
| 312437 ||  || — || April 27, 2008 || Kitt Peak || Spacewatch || — || align=right | 1.6 km || 
|-id=438 bgcolor=#d6d6d6
| 312438 ||  || — || April 28, 2008 || Kitt Peak || Spacewatch || — || align=right | 3.0 km || 
|-id=439 bgcolor=#d6d6d6
| 312439 ||  || — || April 29, 2008 || Mount Lemmon || Mount Lemmon Survey || VER || align=right | 3.2 km || 
|-id=440 bgcolor=#d6d6d6
| 312440 ||  || — || April 29, 2008 || Kitt Peak || Spacewatch || — || align=right | 2.2 km || 
|-id=441 bgcolor=#d6d6d6
| 312441 ||  || — || April 1, 2008 || Kitt Peak || Spacewatch || 7:4 || align=right | 4.1 km || 
|-id=442 bgcolor=#d6d6d6
| 312442 ||  || — || April 28, 2008 || Mount Lemmon || Mount Lemmon Survey || — || align=right | 3.7 km || 
|-id=443 bgcolor=#d6d6d6
| 312443 ||  || — || April 29, 2008 || Kitt Peak || Spacewatch || — || align=right | 3.0 km || 
|-id=444 bgcolor=#d6d6d6
| 312444 ||  || — || May 3, 2008 || Bisei SG Center || BATTeRS || — || align=right | 4.2 km || 
|-id=445 bgcolor=#d6d6d6
| 312445 ||  || — || May 1, 2008 || Kitt Peak || Spacewatch || — || align=right | 4.1 km || 
|-id=446 bgcolor=#E9E9E9
| 312446 ||  || — || May 6, 2008 || Tiki || N. Teamo || — || align=right | 2.7 km || 
|-id=447 bgcolor=#E9E9E9
| 312447 ||  || — || May 6, 2008 || Siding Spring || SSS || JUN || align=right | 1.5 km || 
|-id=448 bgcolor=#d6d6d6
| 312448 ||  || — || May 6, 2008 || Kitt Peak || Spacewatch || VER || align=right | 3.9 km || 
|-id=449 bgcolor=#d6d6d6
| 312449 ||  || — || May 13, 2008 || Mount Lemmon || Mount Lemmon Survey || EOS || align=right | 2.3 km || 
|-id=450 bgcolor=#d6d6d6
| 312450 ||  || — || May 27, 2008 || Kitt Peak || Spacewatch || — || align=right | 3.4 km || 
|-id=451 bgcolor=#d6d6d6
| 312451 ||  || — || May 27, 2008 || Kitt Peak || Spacewatch || — || align=right | 4.0 km || 
|-id=452 bgcolor=#d6d6d6
| 312452 ||  || — || May 29, 2008 || Kitt Peak || Spacewatch || — || align=right | 4.4 km || 
|-id=453 bgcolor=#d6d6d6
| 312453 ||  || — || May 29, 2008 || Kitt Peak || Spacewatch || EOS || align=right | 2.6 km || 
|-id=454 bgcolor=#d6d6d6
| 312454 ||  || — || May 28, 2008 || Mount Lemmon || Mount Lemmon Survey || — || align=right | 4.4 km || 
|-id=455 bgcolor=#d6d6d6
| 312455 ||  || — || May 31, 2008 || Kitt Peak || Spacewatch || — || align=right | 3.1 km || 
|-id=456 bgcolor=#d6d6d6
| 312456 ||  || — || June 1, 2008 || Kitt Peak || Spacewatch || — || align=right | 3.6 km || 
|-id=457 bgcolor=#C2FFFF
| 312457 ||  || — || August 23, 2008 || Kitt Peak || Spacewatch || L4 || align=right | 15 km || 
|-id=458 bgcolor=#C2FFFF
| 312458 ||  || — || August 24, 2008 || Kitt Peak || Spacewatch || L4 || align=right | 8.3 km || 
|-id=459 bgcolor=#C2FFFF
| 312459 ||  || — || August 25, 2008 || Siding Spring || SSS || L4 || align=right | 16 km || 
|-id=460 bgcolor=#d6d6d6
| 312460 ||  || — || August 21, 2008 || Kitt Peak || Spacewatch || — || align=right | 4.0 km || 
|-id=461 bgcolor=#C2FFFF
| 312461 ||  || — || September 4, 2008 || Kitt Peak || Spacewatch || L4ERY || align=right | 14 km || 
|-id=462 bgcolor=#C2FFFF
| 312462 ||  || — || September 4, 2008 || Kitt Peak || Spacewatch || L4 || align=right | 8.0 km || 
|-id=463 bgcolor=#C2FFFF
| 312463 ||  || — || September 4, 2008 || Kitt Peak || Spacewatch || L4 || align=right | 13 km || 
|-id=464 bgcolor=#C2FFFF
| 312464 ||  || — || September 2, 2008 || Kitt Peak || Spacewatch || L4 || align=right | 8.6 km || 
|-id=465 bgcolor=#C2FFFF
| 312465 ||  || — || September 2, 2008 || Kitt Peak || Spacewatch || L4 || align=right | 8.4 km || 
|-id=466 bgcolor=#C2FFFF
| 312466 ||  || — || September 5, 2008 || Kitt Peak || Spacewatch || L4 || align=right | 9.5 km || 
|-id=467 bgcolor=#C2FFFF
| 312467 ||  || — || September 20, 2008 || Mount Lemmon || Mount Lemmon Survey || L4 || align=right | 9.1 km || 
|-id=468 bgcolor=#C2FFFF
| 312468 ||  || — || September 21, 2008 || Kitt Peak || Spacewatch || L4 || align=right | 8.0 km || 
|-id=469 bgcolor=#C2FFFF
| 312469 ||  || — || September 27, 2008 || Altschwendt || W. Ries || L4 || align=right | 8.3 km || 
|-id=470 bgcolor=#fefefe
| 312470 ||  || — || September 23, 2008 || Kitt Peak || Spacewatch || H || align=right data-sort-value="0.88" | 880 m || 
|-id=471 bgcolor=#C2FFFF
| 312471 ||  || — || September 22, 2008 || Socorro || LINEAR || L4 || align=right | 15 km || 
|-id=472 bgcolor=#C2FFFF
| 312472 ||  || — || September 29, 2008 || Mount Lemmon || Mount Lemmon Survey || L4 || align=right | 8.3 km || 
|-id=473 bgcolor=#FFC2E0
| 312473 ||  || — || September 29, 2008 || Mount Lemmon || Mount Lemmon Survey || AMO || align=right data-sort-value="0.75" | 750 m || 
|-id=474 bgcolor=#C2FFFF
| 312474 ||  || — || September 19, 2008 || Kitt Peak || Spacewatch || L4ERY || align=right | 14 km || 
|-id=475 bgcolor=#C2FFFF
| 312475 ||  || — || September 23, 2008 || Mount Lemmon || Mount Lemmon Survey || L4 || align=right | 7.9 km || 
|-id=476 bgcolor=#C2FFFF
| 312476 ||  || — || September 24, 2008 || Mount Lemmon || Mount Lemmon Survey || L4 || align=right | 14 km || 
|-id=477 bgcolor=#C2FFFF
| 312477 ||  || — || September 28, 2008 || Mount Lemmon || Mount Lemmon Survey || L4 || align=right | 8.3 km || 
|-id=478 bgcolor=#C2FFFF
| 312478 ||  || — || September 29, 2008 || Catalina || CSS || L4 || align=right | 11 km || 
|-id=479 bgcolor=#C2FFFF
| 312479 ||  || — || October 1, 2008 || Mount Lemmon || Mount Lemmon Survey || L4 || align=right | 7.9 km || 
|-id=480 bgcolor=#C2FFFF
| 312480 ||  || — || October 2, 2008 || Kitt Peak || Spacewatch || L4 || align=right | 12 km || 
|-id=481 bgcolor=#fefefe
| 312481 ||  || — || October 6, 2008 || Catalina || CSS || H || align=right data-sort-value="0.81" | 810 m || 
|-id=482 bgcolor=#C2FFFF
| 312482 ||  || — || October 8, 2008 || Mount Lemmon || Mount Lemmon Survey || L4 || align=right | 12 km || 
|-id=483 bgcolor=#C2FFFF
| 312483 ||  || — || October 2, 2008 || Mount Lemmon || Mount Lemmon Survey || L4 || align=right | 8.5 km || 
|-id=484 bgcolor=#C2FFFF
| 312484 ||  || — || October 18, 2008 || Kitt Peak || Spacewatch || L4 || align=right | 9.4 km || 
|-id=485 bgcolor=#fefefe
| 312485 ||  || — || October 27, 2008 || Mount Lemmon || Mount Lemmon Survey || H || align=right | 1.1 km || 
|-id=486 bgcolor=#C2FFFF
| 312486 ||  || — || October 25, 2008 || Mount Lemmon || Mount Lemmon Survey || L4 || align=right | 8.9 km || 
|-id=487 bgcolor=#C2FFFF
| 312487 ||  || — || October 26, 2008 || Mount Lemmon || Mount Lemmon Survey || L4 || align=right | 11 km || 
|-id=488 bgcolor=#fefefe
| 312488 ||  || — || November 2, 2008 || Mount Lemmon || Mount Lemmon Survey || — || align=right data-sort-value="0.79" | 790 m || 
|-id=489 bgcolor=#fefefe
| 312489 ||  || — || November 30, 2008 || Catalina || CSS || H || align=right | 1.1 km || 
|-id=490 bgcolor=#fefefe
| 312490 ||  || — || November 24, 2008 || Mount Lemmon || Mount Lemmon Survey || — || align=right data-sort-value="0.74" | 740 m || 
|-id=491 bgcolor=#fefefe
| 312491 ||  || — || December 27, 2008 || Bisei SG Center || BATTeRS || FLO || align=right data-sort-value="0.81" | 810 m || 
|-id=492 bgcolor=#fefefe
| 312492 ||  || — || December 29, 2008 || Kitt Peak || Spacewatch || — || align=right | 1.1 km || 
|-id=493 bgcolor=#fefefe
| 312493 ||  || — || December 30, 2008 || Kitt Peak || Spacewatch || — || align=right data-sort-value="0.68" | 680 m || 
|-id=494 bgcolor=#fefefe
| 312494 ||  || — || January 2, 2009 || Mount Lemmon || Mount Lemmon Survey || V || align=right data-sort-value="0.80" | 800 m || 
|-id=495 bgcolor=#fefefe
| 312495 ||  || — || January 1, 2009 || Mount Lemmon || Mount Lemmon Survey || FLO || align=right data-sort-value="0.80" | 800 m || 
|-id=496 bgcolor=#fefefe
| 312496 ||  || — || January 18, 2009 || Socorro || LINEAR || — || align=right | 1.1 km || 
|-id=497 bgcolor=#fefefe
| 312497 ||  || — || January 17, 2009 || Mount Lemmon || Mount Lemmon Survey || FLO || align=right data-sort-value="0.65" | 650 m || 
|-id=498 bgcolor=#fefefe
| 312498 ||  || — || January 25, 2009 || Kitt Peak || Spacewatch || V || align=right data-sort-value="0.70" | 700 m || 
|-id=499 bgcolor=#fefefe
| 312499 ||  || — || January 25, 2009 || Kitt Peak || Spacewatch || — || align=right | 1.1 km || 
|-id=500 bgcolor=#fefefe
| 312500 ||  || — || January 29, 2009 || Mount Lemmon || Mount Lemmon Survey || — || align=right data-sort-value="0.79" | 790 m || 
|}

312501–312600 

|-bgcolor=#fefefe
| 312501 ||  || — || January 27, 2009 || Purple Mountain || PMO NEO || FLO || align=right data-sort-value="0.76" | 760 m || 
|-id=502 bgcolor=#fefefe
| 312502 ||  || — || January 29, 2009 || Mount Lemmon || Mount Lemmon Survey || — || align=right data-sort-value="0.91" | 910 m || 
|-id=503 bgcolor=#fefefe
| 312503 ||  || — || January 31, 2009 || Kitt Peak || Spacewatch || — || align=right data-sort-value="0.84" | 840 m || 
|-id=504 bgcolor=#fefefe
| 312504 ||  || — || January 31, 2009 || Kitt Peak || Spacewatch || MAS || align=right data-sort-value="0.87" | 870 m || 
|-id=505 bgcolor=#fefefe
| 312505 ||  || — || January 31, 2009 || Mount Lemmon || Mount Lemmon Survey || NYS || align=right data-sort-value="0.84" | 840 m || 
|-id=506 bgcolor=#fefefe
| 312506 ||  || — || January 31, 2009 || Kitt Peak || Spacewatch || V || align=right data-sort-value="0.78" | 780 m || 
|-id=507 bgcolor=#fefefe
| 312507 ||  || — || January 31, 2009 || Mount Lemmon || Mount Lemmon Survey || V || align=right data-sort-value="0.96" | 960 m || 
|-id=508 bgcolor=#fefefe
| 312508 ||  || — || January 20, 2009 || Mount Lemmon || Mount Lemmon Survey || NYS || align=right data-sort-value="0.58" | 580 m || 
|-id=509 bgcolor=#fefefe
| 312509 ||  || — || January 20, 2009 || Mount Lemmon || Mount Lemmon Survey || — || align=right data-sort-value="0.88" | 880 m || 
|-id=510 bgcolor=#E9E9E9
| 312510 ||  || — || January 20, 2009 || Mount Lemmon || Mount Lemmon Survey || — || align=right | 1.6 km || 
|-id=511 bgcolor=#fefefe
| 312511 ||  || — || February 1, 2009 || Kitt Peak || Spacewatch || NYS || align=right data-sort-value="0.72" | 720 m || 
|-id=512 bgcolor=#fefefe
| 312512 ||  || — || February 14, 2009 || Kitt Peak || Spacewatch || FLO || align=right data-sort-value="0.87" | 870 m || 
|-id=513 bgcolor=#fefefe
| 312513 ||  || — || February 14, 2009 || Kitt Peak || Spacewatch || — || align=right data-sort-value="0.98" | 980 m || 
|-id=514 bgcolor=#fefefe
| 312514 ||  || — || February 19, 2009 || Mount Lemmon || Mount Lemmon Survey || FLO || align=right data-sort-value="0.62" | 620 m || 
|-id=515 bgcolor=#fefefe
| 312515 ||  || — || February 16, 2009 || La Sagra || OAM Obs. || — || align=right data-sort-value="0.89" | 890 m || 
|-id=516 bgcolor=#fefefe
| 312516 ||  || — || February 16, 2009 || Kitt Peak || Spacewatch || — || align=right data-sort-value="0.80" | 800 m || 
|-id=517 bgcolor=#fefefe
| 312517 ||  || — || February 19, 2009 || Kitt Peak || Spacewatch || MAS || align=right data-sort-value="0.88" | 880 m || 
|-id=518 bgcolor=#fefefe
| 312518 ||  || — || February 20, 2009 || Kitt Peak || Spacewatch || NYS || align=right data-sort-value="0.68" | 680 m || 
|-id=519 bgcolor=#fefefe
| 312519 ||  || — || February 20, 2009 || Kitt Peak || Spacewatch || V || align=right data-sort-value="0.79" | 790 m || 
|-id=520 bgcolor=#fefefe
| 312520 ||  || — || February 20, 2009 || Kitt Peak || Spacewatch || NYS || align=right data-sort-value="0.49" | 490 m || 
|-id=521 bgcolor=#fefefe
| 312521 ||  || — || February 27, 2009 || Dauban || F. Kugel || — || align=right data-sort-value="0.70" | 700 m || 
|-id=522 bgcolor=#fefefe
| 312522 ||  || — || February 19, 2009 || Kitt Peak || Spacewatch || — || align=right data-sort-value="0.98" | 980 m || 
|-id=523 bgcolor=#fefefe
| 312523 ||  || — || February 24, 2009 || Mount Lemmon || Mount Lemmon Survey || — || align=right data-sort-value="0.75" | 750 m || 
|-id=524 bgcolor=#fefefe
| 312524 ||  || — || February 24, 2009 || Mount Lemmon || Mount Lemmon Survey || — || align=right data-sort-value="0.87" | 870 m || 
|-id=525 bgcolor=#fefefe
| 312525 ||  || — || February 26, 2009 || Kitt Peak || Spacewatch || — || align=right | 1.3 km || 
|-id=526 bgcolor=#fefefe
| 312526 ||  || — || February 19, 2009 || Mount Lemmon || Mount Lemmon Survey || V || align=right data-sort-value="0.80" | 800 m || 
|-id=527 bgcolor=#fefefe
| 312527 ||  || — || November 3, 2007 || Kitt Peak || Spacewatch || NYS || align=right data-sort-value="0.76" | 760 m || 
|-id=528 bgcolor=#fefefe
| 312528 ||  || — || February 19, 2009 || Kitt Peak || Spacewatch || FLO || align=right data-sort-value="0.78" | 780 m || 
|-id=529 bgcolor=#fefefe
| 312529 ||  || — || February 19, 2009 || Kitt Peak || Spacewatch || FLO || align=right data-sort-value="0.80" | 800 m || 
|-id=530 bgcolor=#E9E9E9
| 312530 ||  || — || February 19, 2009 || Kitt Peak || Spacewatch || — || align=right | 1.7 km || 
|-id=531 bgcolor=#fefefe
| 312531 ||  || — || February 27, 2009 || Kitt Peak || Spacewatch || MAS || align=right data-sort-value="0.71" | 710 m || 
|-id=532 bgcolor=#E9E9E9
| 312532 ||  || — || February 28, 2009 || Kitt Peak || Spacewatch || — || align=right | 1.5 km || 
|-id=533 bgcolor=#E9E9E9
| 312533 ||  || — || February 24, 2009 || Mount Lemmon || Mount Lemmon Survey || — || align=right | 1.7 km || 
|-id=534 bgcolor=#E9E9E9
| 312534 ||  || — || February 27, 2009 || Siding Spring || SSS || — || align=right | 3.7 km || 
|-id=535 bgcolor=#d6d6d6
| 312535 ||  || — || March 5, 2009 || Cerro Burek || Alianza S4 Obs. || TIR || align=right | 3.4 km || 
|-id=536 bgcolor=#fefefe
| 312536 ||  || — || March 15, 2009 || Kitt Peak || Spacewatch || MAS || align=right data-sort-value="0.92" | 920 m || 
|-id=537 bgcolor=#d6d6d6
| 312537 ||  || — || March 15, 2009 || Kitt Peak || Spacewatch || EOS || align=right | 1.7 km || 
|-id=538 bgcolor=#fefefe
| 312538 ||  || — || March 15, 2009 || La Sagra || OAM Obs. || NYS || align=right data-sort-value="0.76" | 760 m || 
|-id=539 bgcolor=#fefefe
| 312539 ||  || — || March 15, 2009 || Kitt Peak || Spacewatch || — || align=right data-sort-value="0.77" | 770 m || 
|-id=540 bgcolor=#fefefe
| 312540 ||  || — || March 15, 2009 || Siding Spring || SSS || — || align=right | 3.2 km || 
|-id=541 bgcolor=#fefefe
| 312541 ||  || — || March 1, 2009 || Catalina || CSS || — || align=right data-sort-value="0.97" | 970 m || 
|-id=542 bgcolor=#fefefe
| 312542 ||  || — || March 17, 2009 || Vicques || M. Ory || — || align=right | 1.1 km || 
|-id=543 bgcolor=#fefefe
| 312543 ||  || — || March 16, 2009 || Kitt Peak || Spacewatch || — || align=right data-sort-value="0.63" | 630 m || 
|-id=544 bgcolor=#fefefe
| 312544 ||  || — || March 16, 2009 || Kitt Peak || Spacewatch || — || align=right data-sort-value="0.87" | 870 m || 
|-id=545 bgcolor=#fefefe
| 312545 ||  || — || March 16, 2009 || Purple Mountain || PMO NEO || — || align=right data-sort-value="0.79" | 790 m || 
|-id=546 bgcolor=#fefefe
| 312546 ||  || — || March 22, 2009 || Raheny || D. Grennan || — || align=right data-sort-value="0.87" | 870 m || 
|-id=547 bgcolor=#fefefe
| 312547 ||  || — || March 21, 2009 || Kitt Peak || Spacewatch || — || align=right data-sort-value="0.87" | 870 m || 
|-id=548 bgcolor=#fefefe
| 312548 ||  || — || March 20, 2009 || La Sagra || OAM Obs. || FLO || align=right data-sort-value="0.75" | 750 m || 
|-id=549 bgcolor=#fefefe
| 312549 ||  || — || December 11, 2004 || Kitt Peak || Spacewatch || FLO || align=right data-sort-value="0.93" | 930 m || 
|-id=550 bgcolor=#fefefe
| 312550 ||  || — || March 24, 2009 || Mount Lemmon || Mount Lemmon Survey || NYS || align=right data-sort-value="0.67" | 670 m || 
|-id=551 bgcolor=#fefefe
| 312551 ||  || — || March 25, 2009 || Purple Mountain || PMO NEO || — || align=right | 1.0 km || 
|-id=552 bgcolor=#fefefe
| 312552 ||  || — || March 20, 2009 || La Sagra || OAM Obs. || V || align=right data-sort-value="0.88" | 880 m || 
|-id=553 bgcolor=#E9E9E9
| 312553 ||  || — || March 28, 2009 || Kitt Peak || Spacewatch || — || align=right | 1.7 km || 
|-id=554 bgcolor=#fefefe
| 312554 ||  || — || March 21, 2009 || Mount Lemmon || Mount Lemmon Survey || NYS || align=right data-sort-value="0.81" | 810 m || 
|-id=555 bgcolor=#fefefe
| 312555 ||  || — || March 23, 2009 || Mount Lemmon || Mount Lemmon Survey || — || align=right data-sort-value="0.71" | 710 m || 
|-id=556 bgcolor=#fefefe
| 312556 ||  || — || March 16, 2009 || Kitt Peak || Spacewatch || — || align=right data-sort-value="0.77" | 770 m || 
|-id=557 bgcolor=#E9E9E9
| 312557 ||  || — || March 18, 2009 || Kitt Peak || Spacewatch || — || align=right | 1.8 km || 
|-id=558 bgcolor=#fefefe
| 312558 || 2009 GC || — || April 2, 2009 || Taunus || E. Schwab, R. Kling || FLO || align=right data-sort-value="0.85" | 850 m || 
|-id=559 bgcolor=#fefefe
| 312559 ||  || — || April 1, 2009 || Catalina || CSS || H || align=right data-sort-value="0.76" | 760 m || 
|-id=560 bgcolor=#E9E9E9
| 312560 ||  || — || April 3, 2009 || Cerro Burek || Alianza S4 Obs. || — || align=right | 2.9 km || 
|-id=561 bgcolor=#fefefe
| 312561 ||  || — || April 18, 2009 || Tzec Maun || F. Tozzi || PHO || align=right | 1.3 km || 
|-id=562 bgcolor=#fefefe
| 312562 ||  || — || April 17, 2009 || Catalina || CSS || NYS || align=right data-sort-value="0.84" | 840 m || 
|-id=563 bgcolor=#fefefe
| 312563 ||  || — || April 18, 2009 || Vicques || M. Ory || — || align=right | 1.1 km || 
|-id=564 bgcolor=#E9E9E9
| 312564 ||  || — || April 17, 2009 || Kitt Peak || Spacewatch || — || align=right | 2.1 km || 
|-id=565 bgcolor=#fefefe
| 312565 ||  || — || April 17, 2009 || Kitt Peak || Spacewatch || — || align=right data-sort-value="0.89" | 890 m || 
|-id=566 bgcolor=#fefefe
| 312566 ||  || — || April 17, 2009 || Kitt Peak || Spacewatch || — || align=right | 1.1 km || 
|-id=567 bgcolor=#fefefe
| 312567 ||  || — || April 18, 2009 || Kitt Peak || Spacewatch || — || align=right | 1.3 km || 
|-id=568 bgcolor=#E9E9E9
| 312568 ||  || — || April 19, 2009 || Catalina || CSS || — || align=right | 2.2 km || 
|-id=569 bgcolor=#fefefe
| 312569 ||  || — || April 17, 2009 || Catalina || CSS || — || align=right | 1.3 km || 
|-id=570 bgcolor=#E9E9E9
| 312570 ||  || — || April 18, 2009 || Kitt Peak || Spacewatch || — || align=right | 1.3 km || 
|-id=571 bgcolor=#E9E9E9
| 312571 ||  || — || April 20, 2009 || Kitt Peak || Spacewatch || — || align=right | 2.5 km || 
|-id=572 bgcolor=#E9E9E9
| 312572 ||  || — || April 20, 2009 || Kitt Peak || Spacewatch || — || align=right | 2.6 km || 
|-id=573 bgcolor=#E9E9E9
| 312573 ||  || — || April 22, 2009 || Mount Lemmon || Mount Lemmon Survey || — || align=right | 1.1 km || 
|-id=574 bgcolor=#E9E9E9
| 312574 ||  || — || April 23, 2009 || Kitt Peak || Spacewatch || — || align=right | 2.6 km || 
|-id=575 bgcolor=#d6d6d6
| 312575 ||  || — || April 26, 2009 || Kitt Peak || Spacewatch || — || align=right | 3.0 km || 
|-id=576 bgcolor=#E9E9E9
| 312576 ||  || — || April 22, 2009 || Mount Lemmon || Mount Lemmon Survey || AGN || align=right | 1.2 km || 
|-id=577 bgcolor=#E9E9E9
| 312577 ||  || — || April 27, 2009 || Catalina || CSS || — || align=right | 3.6 km || 
|-id=578 bgcolor=#fefefe
| 312578 ||  || — || April 27, 2009 || Catalina || CSS || V || align=right data-sort-value="0.94" | 940 m || 
|-id=579 bgcolor=#E9E9E9
| 312579 ||  || — || April 27, 2009 || Purple Mountain || PMO NEO || — || align=right | 2.4 km || 
|-id=580 bgcolor=#E9E9E9
| 312580 ||  || — || April 26, 2009 || Kitt Peak || Spacewatch || RAF || align=right | 1.3 km || 
|-id=581 bgcolor=#E9E9E9
| 312581 ||  || — || April 28, 2009 || Catalina || CSS || — || align=right | 1.2 km || 
|-id=582 bgcolor=#fefefe
| 312582 ||  || — || April 28, 2009 || Catalina || CSS || — || align=right | 1.1 km || 
|-id=583 bgcolor=#E9E9E9
| 312583 ||  || — || April 28, 2009 || Skylive Obs. || F. Tozzi || EUN || align=right | 2.1 km || 
|-id=584 bgcolor=#E9E9E9
| 312584 ||  || — || April 24, 2009 || Cerro Burek || Alianza S4 Obs. || — || align=right | 1.9 km || 
|-id=585 bgcolor=#fefefe
| 312585 ||  || — || April 26, 2009 || Kitt Peak || Spacewatch || — || align=right data-sort-value="0.86" | 860 m || 
|-id=586 bgcolor=#E9E9E9
| 312586 ||  || — || April 30, 2009 || La Sagra || OAM Obs. || — || align=right | 3.2 km || 
|-id=587 bgcolor=#E9E9E9
| 312587 ||  || — || April 30, 2009 || La Sagra || OAM Obs. || — || align=right | 1.9 km || 
|-id=588 bgcolor=#E9E9E9
| 312588 ||  || — || April 26, 2009 || Purple Mountain || PMO NEO || MAR || align=right | 1.6 km || 
|-id=589 bgcolor=#E9E9E9
| 312589 ||  || — || April 23, 2009 || Kitt Peak || Spacewatch || — || align=right | 2.8 km || 
|-id=590 bgcolor=#fefefe
| 312590 ||  || — || April 17, 2009 || Catalina || CSS || — || align=right data-sort-value="0.98" | 980 m || 
|-id=591 bgcolor=#E9E9E9
| 312591 ||  || — || May 15, 2009 || Catalina || CSS || — || align=right | 2.3 km || 
|-id=592 bgcolor=#E9E9E9
| 312592 ||  || — || May 14, 2009 || Kitt Peak || Spacewatch || — || align=right | 1.7 km || 
|-id=593 bgcolor=#E9E9E9
| 312593 ||  || — || May 18, 2009 || Bergisch Gladbac || W. Bickel || EUN || align=right | 1.5 km || 
|-id=594 bgcolor=#E9E9E9
| 312594 ||  || — || May 23, 2009 || Sierra Stars || R. Matson || — || align=right | 3.0 km || 
|-id=595 bgcolor=#d6d6d6
| 312595 ||  || — || May 25, 2009 || Kitt Peak || Spacewatch || — || align=right | 3.1 km || 
|-id=596 bgcolor=#E9E9E9
| 312596 ||  || — || May 24, 2009 || Catalina || CSS || EUN || align=right | 1.6 km || 
|-id=597 bgcolor=#E9E9E9
| 312597 ||  || — || May 26, 2009 || Catalina || CSS || — || align=right | 2.0 km || 
|-id=598 bgcolor=#E9E9E9
| 312598 ||  || — || May 17, 2009 || Kitt Peak || Spacewatch || JNS || align=right | 2.3 km || 
|-id=599 bgcolor=#d6d6d6
| 312599 ||  || — || May 29, 2009 || Kitt Peak || Spacewatch || — || align=right | 3.4 km || 
|-id=600 bgcolor=#E9E9E9
| 312600 ||  || — || September 26, 2006 || Kitt Peak || Spacewatch || — || align=right | 1.5 km || 
|}

312601–312700 

|-bgcolor=#d6d6d6
| 312601 ||  || — || May 18, 2009 || Mount Lemmon || Mount Lemmon Survey || — || align=right | 3.9 km || 
|-id=602 bgcolor=#E9E9E9
| 312602 ||  || — || June 12, 2009 || Kitt Peak || Spacewatch || — || align=right | 3.2 km || 
|-id=603 bgcolor=#E9E9E9
| 312603 ||  || — || June 1, 2009 || Mount Lemmon || Mount Lemmon Survey || MAR || align=right | 1.5 km || 
|-id=604 bgcolor=#d6d6d6
| 312604 ||  || — || July 19, 2009 || La Sagra || OAM Obs. || — || align=right | 5.5 km || 
|-id=605 bgcolor=#d6d6d6
| 312605 ||  || — || July 19, 2009 || La Sagra || OAM Obs. || — || align=right | 4.1 km || 
|-id=606 bgcolor=#d6d6d6
| 312606 ||  || — || August 15, 2009 || Catalina || CSS || — || align=right | 4.4 km || 
|-id=607 bgcolor=#d6d6d6
| 312607 ||  || — || November 29, 2005 || Kitt Peak || Spacewatch || EOS || align=right | 3.1 km || 
|-id=608 bgcolor=#C2FFFF
| 312608 ||  || — || September 15, 2009 || Kitt Peak || Spacewatch || L4 || align=right | 8.1 km || 
|-id=609 bgcolor=#C2FFFF
| 312609 ||  || — || September 15, 2009 || Kitt Peak || Spacewatch || L4 || align=right | 12 km || 
|-id=610 bgcolor=#C2FFFF
| 312610 ||  || — || September 12, 2009 || Kitt Peak || Spacewatch || L4 || align=right | 11 km || 
|-id=611 bgcolor=#C2FFFF
| 312611 ||  || — || September 15, 2009 || Kitt Peak || Spacewatch || L4 || align=right | 8.2 km || 
|-id=612 bgcolor=#C2FFFF
| 312612 ||  || — || September 17, 2009 || Kitt Peak || Spacewatch || L4 || align=right | 10 km || 
|-id=613 bgcolor=#d6d6d6
| 312613 ||  || — || September 18, 2009 || Kitt Peak || Spacewatch || — || align=right | 3.2 km || 
|-id=614 bgcolor=#C2FFFF
| 312614 ||  || — || September 18, 2009 || Kitt Peak || Spacewatch || L4 || align=right | 11 km || 
|-id=615 bgcolor=#C2FFFF
| 312615 ||  || — || September 18, 2009 || Kitt Peak || Spacewatch || L4 || align=right | 8.6 km || 
|-id=616 bgcolor=#C2FFFF
| 312616 ||  || — || July 30, 2008 || Kitt Peak || Spacewatch || L4 || align=right | 7.7 km || 
|-id=617 bgcolor=#C2FFFF
| 312617 ||  || — || July 30, 2008 || Kitt Peak || Spacewatch || L4 || align=right | 11 km || 
|-id=618 bgcolor=#C2FFFF
| 312618 ||  || — || September 17, 2009 || Kitt Peak || Spacewatch || L4 || align=right | 6.5 km || 
|-id=619 bgcolor=#C2FFFF
| 312619 ||  || — || November 30, 2000 || Apache Point || SDSS || L4 || align=right | 9.9 km || 
|-id=620 bgcolor=#C2FFFF
| 312620 ||  || — || September 21, 2009 || Kitt Peak || Spacewatch || L4ERY || align=right | 8.0 km || 
|-id=621 bgcolor=#C2FFFF
| 312621 ||  || — || September 24, 2009 || Kitt Peak || Spacewatch || L4 || align=right | 8.7 km || 
|-id=622 bgcolor=#C2FFFF
| 312622 ||  || — || September 18, 2009 || Kitt Peak || Spacewatch || L4ERY || align=right | 9.4 km || 
|-id=623 bgcolor=#C2FFFF
| 312623 ||  || — || September 22, 2009 || Kitt Peak || Spacewatch || L4 || align=right | 7.9 km || 
|-id=624 bgcolor=#C2FFFF
| 312624 ||  || — || September 6, 2008 || Kitt Peak || Spacewatch || L4 || align=right | 8.4 km || 
|-id=625 bgcolor=#C2FFFF
| 312625 ||  || — || September 16, 2009 || Kitt Peak || Spacewatch || L4 || align=right | 8.1 km || 
|-id=626 bgcolor=#C2FFFF
| 312626 ||  || — || October 1, 2009 || Mount Lemmon || Mount Lemmon Survey || L4 || align=right | 16 km || 
|-id=627 bgcolor=#C2FFFF
| 312627 ||  || — || October 14, 2009 || La Sagra || OAM Obs. || L4 || align=right | 12 km || 
|-id=628 bgcolor=#C2FFFF
| 312628 ||  || — || October 22, 2009 || Mount Lemmon || Mount Lemmon Survey || L4 || align=right | 7.6 km || 
|-id=629 bgcolor=#C2FFFF
| 312629 ||  || — || October 23, 2009 || Mount Lemmon || Mount Lemmon Survey || L4 || align=right | 9.0 km || 
|-id=630 bgcolor=#C2FFFF
| 312630 ||  || — || October 22, 2009 || Mount Lemmon || Mount Lemmon Survey || L4 || align=right | 11 km || 
|-id=631 bgcolor=#C2FFFF
| 312631 ||  || — || October 21, 2009 || Catalina || CSS || L4 || align=right | 17 km || 
|-id=632 bgcolor=#C2FFFF
| 312632 ||  || — || October 17, 2009 || Mount Lemmon || Mount Lemmon Survey || L4 || align=right | 14 km || 
|-id=633 bgcolor=#C2FFFF
| 312633 ||  || — || November 16, 2009 || Kitt Peak || Spacewatch || L4 || align=right | 12 km || 
|-id=634 bgcolor=#C2FFFF
| 312634 ||  || — || November 16, 2009 || Mount Lemmon || Mount Lemmon Survey || L4 || align=right | 11 km || 
|-id=635 bgcolor=#C2FFFF
| 312635 ||  || — || November 16, 2009 || Mount Lemmon || Mount Lemmon Survey || L4 || align=right | 8.3 km || 
|-id=636 bgcolor=#C2FFFF
| 312636 ||  || — || November 17, 2009 || Mount Lemmon || Mount Lemmon Survey || L4 || align=right | 8.7 km || 
|-id=637 bgcolor=#C2FFFF
| 312637 ||  || — || October 2, 2009 || Mount Lemmon || Mount Lemmon Survey || L4 || align=right | 9.5 km || 
|-id=638 bgcolor=#C2FFFF
| 312638 ||  || — || May 14, 2004 || Kitt Peak || Spacewatch || L4 || align=right | 12 km || 
|-id=639 bgcolor=#C2FFFF
| 312639 ||  || — || September 15, 2010 || Kitt Peak || Spacewatch || L4 || align=right | 11 km || 
|-id=640 bgcolor=#C2FFFF
| 312640 ||  || — || October 26, 2009 || Mount Lemmon || Mount Lemmon Survey || L4 || align=right | 11 km || 
|-id=641 bgcolor=#C2FFFF
| 312641 ||  || — || April 11, 2002 || Palomar || NEAT || L4 || align=right | 15 km || 
|-id=642 bgcolor=#C2FFFF
| 312642 ||  || — || January 21, 2010 || WISE || WISE || L4 || align=right | 12 km || 
|-id=643 bgcolor=#C2FFFF
| 312643 ||  || — || October 9, 2009 || Kitt Peak || Spacewatch || L4 || align=right | 14 km || 
|-id=644 bgcolor=#d6d6d6
| 312644 ||  || — || February 9, 2010 || Mount Lemmon || Mount Lemmon Survey || — || align=right | 3.8 km || 
|-id=645 bgcolor=#C2E0FF
| 312645 ||  || — || March 9, 2010 || La Silla || D. L. Rabinowitz, S. Tourtellotte || twotinocritical || align=right | 346 km || 
|-id=646 bgcolor=#E9E9E9
| 312646 ||  || — || August 19, 1995 || La Silla || C.-I. Lagerkvist || — || align=right | 2.2 km || 
|-id=647 bgcolor=#fefefe
| 312647 ||  || — || April 5, 2010 || Kitt Peak || Spacewatch || FLO || align=right data-sort-value="0.83" | 830 m || 
|-id=648 bgcolor=#E9E9E9
| 312648 ||  || — || May 3, 2010 || WISE || WISE || GEF || align=right | 2.8 km || 
|-id=649 bgcolor=#fefefe
| 312649 ||  || — || May 3, 2010 || Kitt Peak || Spacewatch || — || align=right | 2.3 km || 
|-id=650 bgcolor=#fefefe
| 312650 ||  || — || March 10, 2007 || Catalina || CSS || H || align=right data-sort-value="0.97" | 970 m || 
|-id=651 bgcolor=#fefefe
| 312651 ||  || — || May 6, 2010 || Catalina || CSS || H || align=right | 1.0 km || 
|-id=652 bgcolor=#E9E9E9
| 312652 ||  || — || May 17, 2010 || WISE || WISE || HOF || align=right | 2.6 km || 
|-id=653 bgcolor=#fefefe
| 312653 ||  || — || May 18, 2010 || La Sagra || OAM Obs. || PHO || align=right | 1.2 km || 
|-id=654 bgcolor=#fefefe
| 312654 ||  || — || May 20, 2010 || WISE || WISE || — || align=right | 2.2 km || 
|-id=655 bgcolor=#d6d6d6
| 312655 ||  || — || May 22, 2010 || WISE || WISE || — || align=right | 2.5 km || 
|-id=656 bgcolor=#d6d6d6
| 312656 ||  || — || May 23, 2010 || WISE || WISE || EOS || align=right | 3.0 km || 
|-id=657 bgcolor=#d6d6d6
| 312657 ||  || — || May 25, 2010 || WISE || WISE || — || align=right | 4.0 km || 
|-id=658 bgcolor=#d6d6d6
| 312658 ||  || — || October 1, 2005 || Catalina || CSS || EOS || align=right | 4.7 km || 
|-id=659 bgcolor=#d6d6d6
| 312659 ||  || — || May 27, 2010 || WISE || WISE || HYG || align=right | 3.3 km || 
|-id=660 bgcolor=#d6d6d6
| 312660 ||  || — || May 27, 2010 || WISE || WISE || 628 || align=right | 3.0 km || 
|-id=661 bgcolor=#d6d6d6
| 312661 ||  || — || May 30, 2010 || WISE || WISE || 3:2 || align=right | 5.7 km || 
|-id=662 bgcolor=#E9E9E9
| 312662 ||  || — || June 2, 2010 || WISE || WISE || — || align=right | 2.6 km || 
|-id=663 bgcolor=#E9E9E9
| 312663 ||  || — || June 2, 2010 || WISE || WISE || GER || align=right | 2.6 km || 
|-id=664 bgcolor=#d6d6d6
| 312664 ||  || — || June 2, 2010 || WISE || WISE || HYG || align=right | 4.4 km || 
|-id=665 bgcolor=#fefefe
| 312665 ||  || — || June 1, 2010 || Nogales || Tenagra II Obs. || — || align=right data-sort-value="0.76" | 760 m || 
|-id=666 bgcolor=#d6d6d6
| 312666 ||  || — || June 3, 2010 || WISE || WISE || VER || align=right | 4.1 km || 
|-id=667 bgcolor=#E9E9E9
| 312667 ||  || — || June 8, 2010 || WISE || WISE || GER || align=right | 2.3 km || 
|-id=668 bgcolor=#d6d6d6
| 312668 ||  || — || June 9, 2010 || WISE || WISE || EUP || align=right | 6.4 km || 
|-id=669 bgcolor=#d6d6d6
| 312669 ||  || — || June 6, 2010 || Kitt Peak || Spacewatch || — || align=right | 2.6 km || 
|-id=670 bgcolor=#E9E9E9
| 312670 ||  || — || June 12, 2010 || WISE || WISE || — || align=right | 3.0 km || 
|-id=671 bgcolor=#d6d6d6
| 312671 ||  || — || June 13, 2010 || WISE || WISE || TEL || align=right | 3.9 km || 
|-id=672 bgcolor=#E9E9E9
| 312672 ||  || — || June 13, 2010 || Catalina || CSS || JUN || align=right | 1.5 km || 
|-id=673 bgcolor=#d6d6d6
| 312673 ||  || — || November 3, 1999 || Socorro || LINEAR || LUT || align=right | 5.1 km || 
|-id=674 bgcolor=#d6d6d6
| 312674 ||  || — || June 18, 2010 || WISE || WISE || — || align=right | 3.1 km || 
|-id=675 bgcolor=#d6d6d6
| 312675 ||  || — || June 19, 2010 || WISE || WISE || NAE || align=right | 4.6 km || 
|-id=676 bgcolor=#d6d6d6
| 312676 ||  || — || January 19, 2007 || Mauna Kea || P. A. Wiegert || — || align=right | 2.2 km || 
|-id=677 bgcolor=#fefefe
| 312677 ||  || — || June 24, 2010 || WISE || WISE || PHO || align=right | 1.9 km || 
|-id=678 bgcolor=#d6d6d6
| 312678 ||  || — || August 29, 2005 || Kitt Peak || Spacewatch || — || align=right | 3.4 km || 
|-id=679 bgcolor=#E9E9E9
| 312679 ||  || — || June 26, 2010 || WISE || WISE || MAR || align=right | 2.2 km || 
|-id=680 bgcolor=#d6d6d6
| 312680 ||  || — || February 8, 2007 || Mount Lemmon || Mount Lemmon Survey || — || align=right | 3.7 km || 
|-id=681 bgcolor=#fefefe
| 312681 ||  || — || July 6, 2010 || Catalina || CSS || LCI || align=right | 1.5 km || 
|-id=682 bgcolor=#E9E9E9
| 312682 ||  || — || July 6, 2010 || Catalina || CSS || — || align=right | 3.9 km || 
|-id=683 bgcolor=#fefefe
| 312683 ||  || — || July 24, 2003 || Palomar || NEAT || — || align=right | 1.3 km || 
|-id=684 bgcolor=#d6d6d6
| 312684 ||  || — || September 6, 2004 || Siding Spring || SSS || — || align=right | 4.7 km || 
|-id=685 bgcolor=#d6d6d6
| 312685 ||  || — || July 7, 2010 || WISE || WISE || — || align=right | 3.8 km || 
|-id=686 bgcolor=#d6d6d6
| 312686 ||  || — || July 8, 2010 || WISE || WISE || — || align=right | 2.4 km || 
|-id=687 bgcolor=#E9E9E9
| 312687 ||  || — || July 9, 2010 || WISE || WISE || — || align=right | 2.6 km || 
|-id=688 bgcolor=#d6d6d6
| 312688 ||  || — || April 3, 2008 || Mount Lemmon || Mount Lemmon Survey || — || align=right | 3.1 km || 
|-id=689 bgcolor=#E9E9E9
| 312689 ||  || — || September 30, 2005 || Mount Lemmon || Mount Lemmon Survey || — || align=right | 2.6 km || 
|-id=690 bgcolor=#d6d6d6
| 312690 ||  || — || July 11, 2010 || WISE || WISE || — || align=right | 4.6 km || 
|-id=691 bgcolor=#d6d6d6
| 312691 ||  || — || July 1, 2010 || WISE || WISE || — || align=right | 2.9 km || 
|-id=692 bgcolor=#E9E9E9
| 312692 ||  || — || March 10, 2008 || Kitt Peak || Spacewatch || HOF || align=right | 2.7 km || 
|-id=693 bgcolor=#E9E9E9
| 312693 ||  || — || March 11, 2008 || Kitt Peak || Spacewatch || HOF || align=right | 2.9 km || 
|-id=694 bgcolor=#d6d6d6
| 312694 ||  || — || July 5, 2010 || Kitt Peak || Spacewatch || — || align=right | 3.0 km || 
|-id=695 bgcolor=#d6d6d6
| 312695 ||  || — || November 3, 2005 || Mount Lemmon || Mount Lemmon Survey || HYG || align=right | 2.6 km || 
|-id=696 bgcolor=#d6d6d6
| 312696 ||  || — || October 1, 2005 || Catalina || CSS || NAE || align=right | 3.5 km || 
|-id=697 bgcolor=#E9E9E9
| 312697 ||  || — || August 29, 2001 || Palomar || NEAT || — || align=right | 2.6 km || 
|-id=698 bgcolor=#d6d6d6
| 312698 ||  || — || March 6, 2008 || Mount Lemmon || Mount Lemmon Survey || — || align=right | 4.1 km || 
|-id=699 bgcolor=#d6d6d6
| 312699 ||  || — || February 19, 2007 || Catalina || CSS || ARM || align=right | 5.2 km || 
|-id=700 bgcolor=#C2FFFF
| 312700 ||  || — || July 26, 2010 || WISE || WISE || L4 || align=right | 10 km || 
|}

312701–312800 

|-bgcolor=#d6d6d6
| 312701 ||  || — || September 21, 2004 || Socorro || LINEAR || URS || align=right | 6.0 km || 
|-id=702 bgcolor=#E9E9E9
| 312702 ||  || — || January 11, 2008 || Mount Lemmon || Mount Lemmon Survey || — || align=right | 3.8 km || 
|-id=703 bgcolor=#d6d6d6
| 312703 ||  || — || January 21, 2001 || Socorro || LINEAR || — || align=right | 4.5 km || 
|-id=704 bgcolor=#E9E9E9
| 312704 ||  || — || August 5, 2010 || Socorro || LINEAR || EUN || align=right | 1.7 km || 
|-id=705 bgcolor=#d6d6d6
| 312705 ||  || — || November 4, 2004 || Kitt Peak || Spacewatch || SYL7:4 || align=right | 4.3 km || 
|-id=706 bgcolor=#d6d6d6
| 312706 ||  || — || January 28, 2007 || Catalina || CSS || ALA || align=right | 7.1 km || 
|-id=707 bgcolor=#C2FFFF
| 312707 ||  || — || August 7, 2010 || WISE || WISE || L4 || align=right | 16 km || 
|-id=708 bgcolor=#d6d6d6
| 312708 ||  || — || January 23, 2006 || Catalina || CSS || 7:4 || align=right | 5.9 km || 
|-id=709 bgcolor=#d6d6d6
| 312709 ||  || — || December 21, 2006 || Mount Lemmon || Mount Lemmon Survey || NAE || align=right | 4.9 km || 
|-id=710 bgcolor=#d6d6d6
| 312710 ||  || — || September 11, 2005 || Kitt Peak || Spacewatch || — || align=right | 2.6 km || 
|-id=711 bgcolor=#d6d6d6
| 312711 ||  || — || August 22, 1998 || Xinglong || SCAP || — || align=right | 5.8 km || 
|-id=712 bgcolor=#d6d6d6
| 312712 ||  || — || August 10, 2010 || Kitt Peak || Spacewatch || KOR || align=right | 1.8 km || 
|-id=713 bgcolor=#fefefe
| 312713 ||  || — || August 18, 2010 || Purple Mountain || PMO NEO || — || align=right | 1.1 km || 
|-id=714 bgcolor=#d6d6d6
| 312714 ||  || — || September 1, 2010 || ESA OGS || ESA OGS || — || align=right | 3.8 km || 
|-id=715 bgcolor=#d6d6d6
| 312715 ||  || — || December 15, 2006 || Kitt Peak || Spacewatch || EOS || align=right | 2.4 km || 
|-id=716 bgcolor=#C2FFFF
| 312716 ||  || — || April 28, 2004 || Kitt Peak || Spacewatch || L4 || align=right | 12 km || 
|-id=717 bgcolor=#E9E9E9
| 312717 ||  || — || May 16, 2005 || Kitt Peak || Spacewatch || — || align=right | 2.5 km || 
|-id=718 bgcolor=#fefefe
| 312718 ||  || — || September 6, 2010 || Plana || F. Fratev || — || align=right | 1.2 km || 
|-id=719 bgcolor=#d6d6d6
| 312719 ||  || — || September 13, 2005 || Kitt Peak || Spacewatch || K-2 || align=right | 1.8 km || 
|-id=720 bgcolor=#d6d6d6
| 312720 ||  || — || September 4, 2010 || Socorro || LINEAR || HYG || align=right | 3.8 km || 
|-id=721 bgcolor=#d6d6d6
| 312721 ||  || — || August 10, 2004 || Socorro || LINEAR || THM || align=right | 3.4 km || 
|-id=722 bgcolor=#d6d6d6
| 312722 ||  || — || September 29, 2005 || Kitt Peak || Spacewatch || HYG || align=right | 2.9 km || 
|-id=723 bgcolor=#d6d6d6
| 312723 ||  || — || June 13, 2010 || Mount Lemmon || Mount Lemmon Survey || — || align=right | 3.7 km || 
|-id=724 bgcolor=#d6d6d6
| 312724 ||  || — || October 4, 1996 || Kitt Peak || Spacewatch || KAR || align=right | 1.2 km || 
|-id=725 bgcolor=#E9E9E9
| 312725 ||  || — || February 27, 2008 || Mount Lemmon || Mount Lemmon Survey || WIT || align=right | 1.2 km || 
|-id=726 bgcolor=#E9E9E9
| 312726 ||  || — || January 23, 2003 || La Silla || A. Boattini, H. Scholl || HOF || align=right | 2.7 km || 
|-id=727 bgcolor=#fefefe
| 312727 ||  || — || September 10, 2010 || Mount Lemmon || Mount Lemmon Survey || V || align=right data-sort-value="0.88" | 880 m || 
|-id=728 bgcolor=#d6d6d6
| 312728 ||  || — || February 1, 2001 || Socorro || LINEAR || TIR || align=right | 3.6 km || 
|-id=729 bgcolor=#E9E9E9
| 312729 ||  || — || June 13, 2005 || Mount Lemmon || Mount Lemmon Survey || — || align=right | 2.5 km || 
|-id=730 bgcolor=#E9E9E9
| 312730 ||  || — || January 3, 2003 || Kitt Peak || Spacewatch || — || align=right | 2.9 km || 
|-id=731 bgcolor=#d6d6d6
| 312731 ||  || — || September 8, 2004 || Saint-Véran || Saint-Véran Obs. || — || align=right | 3.6 km || 
|-id=732 bgcolor=#fefefe
| 312732 ||  || — || July 21, 1999 || Anderson Mesa || LONEOS || NYS || align=right data-sort-value="0.98" | 980 m || 
|-id=733 bgcolor=#d6d6d6
| 312733 ||  || — || December 15, 2006 || Kitt Peak || Spacewatch || K-2 || align=right | 1.4 km || 
|-id=734 bgcolor=#d6d6d6
| 312734 ||  || — || November 25, 2005 || Catalina || CSS || EOS || align=right | 2.3 km || 
|-id=735 bgcolor=#d6d6d6
| 312735 ||  || — || October 29, 2005 || Catalina || CSS || EOS || align=right | 2.4 km || 
|-id=736 bgcolor=#d6d6d6
| 312736 ||  || — || November 3, 2005 || Catalina || CSS || EOS || align=right | 2.1 km || 
|-id=737 bgcolor=#d6d6d6
| 312737 ||  || — || January 28, 2007 || Kitt Peak || Spacewatch || — || align=right | 3.8 km || 
|-id=738 bgcolor=#E9E9E9
| 312738 ||  || — || October 14, 2001 || Socorro || LINEAR || — || align=right | 3.4 km || 
|-id=739 bgcolor=#d6d6d6
| 312739 ||  || — || October 1, 2005 || Kitt Peak || Spacewatch || — || align=right | 3.0 km || 
|-id=740 bgcolor=#E9E9E9
| 312740 ||  || — || November 22, 2006 || Kitt Peak || Spacewatch || HOF || align=right | 2.7 km || 
|-id=741 bgcolor=#d6d6d6
| 312741 ||  || — || October 9, 2005 || Kitt Peak || Spacewatch || — || align=right | 2.0 km || 
|-id=742 bgcolor=#d6d6d6
| 312742 ||  || — || November 25, 2005 || Mount Lemmon || Mount Lemmon Survey || THM || align=right | 2.7 km || 
|-id=743 bgcolor=#E9E9E9
| 312743 ||  || — || November 12, 2006 || Mount Lemmon || Mount Lemmon Survey || — || align=right | 1.7 km || 
|-id=744 bgcolor=#d6d6d6
| 312744 ||  || — || April 1, 2008 || Mount Lemmon || Mount Lemmon Survey || — || align=right | 2.7 km || 
|-id=745 bgcolor=#fefefe
| 312745 ||  || — || September 17, 2006 || Kitt Peak || Spacewatch || — || align=right | 1.2 km || 
|-id=746 bgcolor=#E9E9E9
| 312746 ||  || — || October 21, 2006 || Lulin || LUSS || HOF || align=right | 2.9 km || 
|-id=747 bgcolor=#d6d6d6
| 312747 ||  || — || October 1, 2005 || Mount Lemmon || Mount Lemmon Survey || — || align=right | 3.8 km || 
|-id=748 bgcolor=#d6d6d6
| 312748 ||  || — || May 3, 2008 || Kitt Peak || Spacewatch || — || align=right | 2.9 km || 
|-id=749 bgcolor=#d6d6d6
| 312749 ||  || — || August 30, 2005 || Kitt Peak || Spacewatch || — || align=right | 2.7 km || 
|-id=750 bgcolor=#E9E9E9
| 312750 ||  || — || November 17, 2006 || Mount Lemmon || Mount Lemmon Survey || AGN || align=right | 1.4 km || 
|-id=751 bgcolor=#fefefe
| 312751 ||  || — || April 24, 2006 || Reedy Creek || J. Broughton || FLO || align=right data-sort-value="0.77" | 770 m || 
|-id=752 bgcolor=#d6d6d6
| 312752 ||  || — || March 26, 2003 || Kitt Peak || Spacewatch || KOR || align=right | 1.6 km || 
|-id=753 bgcolor=#fefefe
| 312753 ||  || — || September 28, 2006 || Kitt Peak || Spacewatch || — || align=right | 1.1 km || 
|-id=754 bgcolor=#fefefe
| 312754 ||  || — || October 10, 1999 || Kitt Peak || Spacewatch || NYS || align=right data-sort-value="0.79" | 790 m || 
|-id=755 bgcolor=#d6d6d6
| 312755 ||  || — || August 22, 2004 || Kitt Peak || Spacewatch || — || align=right | 3.4 km || 
|-id=756 bgcolor=#E9E9E9
| 312756 ||  || — || April 15, 2008 || Mount Lemmon || Mount Lemmon Survey || HOF || align=right | 3.0 km || 
|-id=757 bgcolor=#d6d6d6
| 312757 ||  || — || August 28, 2005 || Kitt Peak || Spacewatch || — || align=right | 2.5 km || 
|-id=758 bgcolor=#d6d6d6
| 312758 ||  || — || July 16, 2004 || Cerro Tololo || M. W. Buie || — || align=right | 3.7 km || 
|-id=759 bgcolor=#E9E9E9
| 312759 ||  || — || June 17, 2005 || Mount Lemmon || Mount Lemmon Survey || — || align=right | 3.0 km || 
|-id=760 bgcolor=#d6d6d6
| 312760 ||  || — || August 23, 2004 || Kitt Peak || Spacewatch || — || align=right | 3.2 km || 
|-id=761 bgcolor=#d6d6d6
| 312761 ||  || — || December 13, 2006 || Kitt Peak || Spacewatch || KOR || align=right | 1.5 km || 
|-id=762 bgcolor=#d6d6d6
| 312762 ||  || — || October 5, 2005 || Mount Lemmon || Mount Lemmon Survey || KOR || align=right | 1.4 km || 
|-id=763 bgcolor=#d6d6d6
| 312763 ||  || — || March 28, 2008 || Mount Lemmon || Mount Lemmon Survey || KOR || align=right | 1.4 km || 
|-id=764 bgcolor=#d6d6d6
| 312764 ||  || — || October 7, 2004 || Kitt Peak || Spacewatch || THM || align=right | 3.5 km || 
|-id=765 bgcolor=#d6d6d6
| 312765 ||  || — || October 4, 1999 || Kitt Peak || Spacewatch || — || align=right | 3.3 km || 
|-id=766 bgcolor=#C2FFFF
| 312766 ||  || — || May 20, 2005 || Mount Lemmon || Mount Lemmon Survey || L4 || align=right | 13 km || 
|-id=767 bgcolor=#d6d6d6
| 312767 ||  || — || December 25, 2005 || Kitt Peak || Spacewatch || THM || align=right | 2.1 km || 
|-id=768 bgcolor=#d6d6d6
| 312768 ||  || — || February 16, 2002 || Palomar || NEAT || — || align=right | 4.0 km || 
|-id=769 bgcolor=#d6d6d6
| 312769 ||  || — || December 7, 2005 || Kitt Peak || Spacewatch || HYG || align=right | 3.9 km || 
|-id=770 bgcolor=#C2FFFF
| 312770 ||  || — || September 6, 2008 || Mount Lemmon || Mount Lemmon Survey || L4 || align=right | 8.7 km || 
|-id=771 bgcolor=#E9E9E9
| 312771 ||  || — || June 11, 2004 || Kitt Peak || Spacewatch || MRX || align=right | 1.4 km || 
|-id=772 bgcolor=#E9E9E9
| 312772 ||  || — || December 11, 2002 || Kitt Peak || Spacewatch || ADE || align=right | 2.5 km || 
|-id=773 bgcolor=#C2FFFF
| 312773 ||  || — || January 12, 2010 || WISE || WISE || L4 || align=right | 13 km || 
|-id=774 bgcolor=#E9E9E9
| 312774 ||  || — || July 7, 2005 || Kitt Peak || Spacewatch || — || align=right | 1.3 km || 
|-id=775 bgcolor=#C2FFFF
| 312775 ||  || — || March 26, 2003 || Kitt Peak || Spacewatch || L4 || align=right | 11 km || 
|-id=776 bgcolor=#E9E9E9
| 312776 ||  || — || November 2, 2006 || Mount Lemmon || Mount Lemmon Survey || — || align=right | 1.5 km || 
|-id=777 bgcolor=#d6d6d6
| 312777 ||  || — || September 13, 2004 || Palomar || NEAT || — || align=right | 3.9 km || 
|-id=778 bgcolor=#C2FFFF
| 312778 ||  || — || October 21, 2009 || Catalina || CSS || L4 || align=right | 16 km || 
|-id=779 bgcolor=#C2FFFF
| 312779 ||  || — || July 29, 2009 || Kitt Peak || Spacewatch || L4 || align=right | 13 km || 
|-id=780 bgcolor=#d6d6d6
| 312780 ||  || — || February 6, 2007 || Mount Lemmon || Mount Lemmon Survey || — || align=right | 3.1 km || 
|-id=781 bgcolor=#fefefe
| 312781 ||  || — || August 28, 2006 || Kitt Peak || Spacewatch || V || align=right data-sort-value="0.94" | 940 m || 
|-id=782 bgcolor=#C2FFFF
| 312782 ||  || — || December 16, 2007 || Mount Lemmon || Mount Lemmon Survey || L4 || align=right | 12 km || 
|-id=783 bgcolor=#d6d6d6
| 312783 ||  || — || March 13, 2008 || Kitt Peak || Spacewatch || THM || align=right | 2.6 km || 
|-id=784 bgcolor=#fefefe
| 312784 ||  || — || September 2, 2000 || Anderson Mesa || LONEOS || — || align=right data-sort-value="0.84" | 840 m || 
|-id=785 bgcolor=#fefefe
| 312785 ||  || — || July 16, 2002 || Palomar || NEAT || — || align=right | 1.2 km || 
|-id=786 bgcolor=#C2FFFF
| 312786 ||  || — || October 2, 2009 || Mount Lemmon || Mount Lemmon Survey || L4 || align=right | 12 km || 
|-id=787 bgcolor=#C2FFFF
| 312787 ||  || — || May 10, 2005 || Mount Lemmon || Mount Lemmon Survey || L4 || align=right | 14 km || 
|-id=788 bgcolor=#C2FFFF
| 312788 ||  || — || June 22, 1995 || Kitt Peak || Spacewatch || L4 || align=right | 11 km || 
|-id=789 bgcolor=#d6d6d6
| 312789 ||  || — || July 23, 2003 || Palomar || NEAT || — || align=right | 5.1 km || 
|-id=790 bgcolor=#d6d6d6
| 312790 ||  || — || April 8, 2002 || Palomar || NEAT || — || align=right | 4.8 km || 
|-id=791 bgcolor=#C2FFFF
| 312791 ||  || — || November 18, 1998 || Kitt Peak || M. W. Buie || L4 || align=right | 8.9 km || 
|-id=792 bgcolor=#d6d6d6
| 312792 ||  || — || June 22, 2004 || Kitt Peak || Spacewatch || — || align=right | 3.7 km || 
|-id=793 bgcolor=#C2FFFF
| 312793 ||  || — || September 4, 2008 || Kitt Peak || Spacewatch || L4 || align=right | 10 km || 
|-id=794 bgcolor=#d6d6d6
| 312794 ||  || — || December 1, 2005 || Mount Lemmon || Mount Lemmon Survey || — || align=right | 5.3 km || 
|-id=795 bgcolor=#d6d6d6
| 312795 ||  || — || November 30, 2000 || Apache Point || SDSS || — || align=right | 5.6 km || 
|-id=796 bgcolor=#C2FFFF
| 312796 ||  || — || September 4, 2008 || Kitt Peak || Spacewatch || L4 || align=right | 9.4 km || 
|-id=797 bgcolor=#C2FFFF
| 312797 ||  || — || September 27, 2009 || Kitt Peak || Spacewatch || L4 || align=right | 8.6 km || 
|-id=798 bgcolor=#C2FFFF
| 312798 ||  || — || September 19, 2009 || Kitt Peak || Spacewatch || L4 || align=right | 8.1 km || 
|-id=799 bgcolor=#C2FFFF
| 312799 ||  || — || June 21, 2007 || Mount Lemmon || Mount Lemmon Survey || L4 || align=right | 10 km || 
|-id=800 bgcolor=#d6d6d6
| 312800 ||  || — || January 28, 2007 || Kitt Peak || Spacewatch || CHA || align=right | 3.0 km || 
|}

312801–312900 

|-bgcolor=#C2FFFF
| 312801 ||  || — || September 24, 2008 || Mount Lemmon || Mount Lemmon Survey || L4 || align=right | 8.8 km || 
|-id=802 bgcolor=#C2FFFF
| 312802 ||  || — || January 5, 2000 || Socorro || LINEAR || L4 || align=right | 21 km || 
|-id=803 bgcolor=#C2FFFF
| 312803 ||  || — || September 13, 2007 || Mount Lemmon || Mount Lemmon Survey || L4 || align=right | 11 km || 
|-id=804 bgcolor=#C2FFFF
| 312804 ||  || — || August 22, 1995 || Kitt Peak || Spacewatch || L4 || align=right | 10 km || 
|-id=805 bgcolor=#C2FFFF
| 312805 ||  || — || April 11, 2003 || Kitt Peak || Spacewatch || L4 || align=right | 10 km || 
|-id=806 bgcolor=#C2FFFF
| 312806 ||  || — || January 2, 2001 || Kitt Peak || Spacewatch || L4 || align=right | 12 km || 
|-id=807 bgcolor=#C2FFFF
| 312807 ||  || — || October 4, 1996 || Kitt Peak || Spacewatch || L4 || align=right | 11 km || 
|-id=808 bgcolor=#d6d6d6
| 312808 ||  || — || September 4, 2003 || Kitt Peak || Spacewatch || — || align=right | 4.5 km || 
|-id=809 bgcolor=#d6d6d6
| 312809 ||  || — || March 3, 2006 || Anderson Mesa || LONEOS || — || align=right | 4.8 km || 
|-id=810 bgcolor=#E9E9E9
| 312810 ||  || — || July 19, 2004 || Anderson Mesa || LONEOS || — || align=right | 1.8 km || 
|-id=811 bgcolor=#E9E9E9
| 312811 ||  || — || September 17, 1995 || Kitt Peak || Spacewatch || — || align=right | 3.1 km || 
|-id=812 bgcolor=#E9E9E9
| 312812 ||  || — || January 4, 2006 || Mount Lemmon || Mount Lemmon Survey || — || align=right | 1.8 km || 
|-id=813 bgcolor=#fefefe
| 312813 ||  || — || April 27, 2001 || Socorro || LINEAR || — || align=right | 1.1 km || 
|-id=814 bgcolor=#E9E9E9
| 312814 ||  || — || February 13, 2002 || Apache Point || SDSS || — || align=right | 1.4 km || 
|-id=815 bgcolor=#fefefe
| 312815 ||  || — || August 31, 2000 || Socorro || LINEAR || CLA || align=right | 2.0 km || 
|-id=816 bgcolor=#d6d6d6
| 312816 ||  || — || December 6, 2002 || Socorro || LINEAR || — || align=right | 4.1 km || 
|-id=817 bgcolor=#fefefe
| 312817 ||  || — || December 1, 2005 || Kitt Peak || Spacewatch || V || align=right data-sort-value="0.64" | 640 m || 
|-id=818 bgcolor=#fefefe
| 312818 ||  || — || May 25, 2007 || Mount Lemmon || Mount Lemmon Survey || — || align=right | 1.0 km || 
|-id=819 bgcolor=#d6d6d6
| 312819 ||  || — || October 15, 2001 || Kitt Peak || Spacewatch || — || align=right | 3.7 km || 
|-id=820 bgcolor=#d6d6d6
| 312820 ||  || — || December 27, 2005 || Kitt Peak || Spacewatch || 3:2 || align=right | 4.8 km || 
|-id=821 bgcolor=#E9E9E9
| 312821 ||  || — || February 12, 2004 || Kitt Peak || Spacewatch || AGN || align=right | 1.5 km || 
|-id=822 bgcolor=#d6d6d6
| 312822 ||  || — || April 22, 2004 || Kitt Peak || Spacewatch || — || align=right | 3.0 km || 
|-id=823 bgcolor=#E9E9E9
| 312823 ||  || — || January 19, 2001 || Haleakala || NEAT || GER || align=right | 2.2 km || 
|-id=824 bgcolor=#d6d6d6
| 312824 ||  || — || March 11, 2002 || Palomar || NEAT || HYG || align=right | 3.9 km || 
|-id=825 bgcolor=#d6d6d6
| 312825 ||  || — || October 21, 1995 || Kitt Peak || Spacewatch || — || align=right | 3.0 km || 
|-id=826 bgcolor=#E9E9E9
| 312826 ||  || — || January 19, 2004 || Kitt Peak || Spacewatch || HEN || align=right | 1.3 km || 
|-id=827 bgcolor=#fefefe
| 312827 ||  || — || April 8, 2002 || Kitt Peak || Spacewatch || V || align=right data-sort-value="0.92" | 920 m || 
|-id=828 bgcolor=#fefefe
| 312828 ||  || — || October 1, 2000 || Anderson Mesa || LONEOS || — || align=right data-sort-value="0.70" | 700 m || 
|-id=829 bgcolor=#d6d6d6
| 312829 ||  || — || November 22, 2006 || Kitt Peak || Spacewatch || HYG || align=right | 3.4 km || 
|-id=830 bgcolor=#fefefe
| 312830 ||  || — || March 23, 2003 || Kitt Peak || Spacewatch || V || align=right data-sort-value="0.76" | 760 m || 
|-id=831 bgcolor=#E9E9E9
| 312831 ||  || — || December 4, 2003 || Socorro || LINEAR || — || align=right | 1.7 km || 
|-id=832 bgcolor=#fefefe
| 312832 ||  || — || January 1, 2009 || Kitt Peak || Spacewatch || V || align=right data-sort-value="0.63" | 630 m || 
|-id=833 bgcolor=#d6d6d6
| 312833 ||  || — || December 18, 2001 || Socorro || LINEAR || — || align=right | 4.0 km || 
|-id=834 bgcolor=#E9E9E9
| 312834 ||  || — || March 15, 2004 || Kitt Peak || Spacewatch || AGN || align=right | 1.2 km || 
|-id=835 bgcolor=#fefefe
| 312835 ||  || — || February 16, 2002 || Palomar || NEAT || — || align=right | 1.4 km || 
|-id=836 bgcolor=#fefefe
| 312836 ||  || — || October 10, 2004 || Kitt Peak || Spacewatch || NYS || align=right data-sort-value="0.65" | 650 m || 
|-id=837 bgcolor=#d6d6d6
| 312837 ||  || — || April 16, 2004 || Kitt Peak || Spacewatch || K-2 || align=right | 1.8 km || 
|-id=838 bgcolor=#d6d6d6
| 312838 ||  || — || April 8, 2002 || Palomar || NEAT || HYG || align=right | 3.5 km || 
|-id=839 bgcolor=#d6d6d6
| 312839 ||  || — || October 22, 2006 || Mount Lemmon || Mount Lemmon Survey || — || align=right | 3.5 km || 
|-id=840 bgcolor=#d6d6d6
| 312840 ||  || — || May 27, 2003 || Kitt Peak || Spacewatch || ALA || align=right | 4.9 km || 
|-id=841 bgcolor=#fefefe
| 312841 ||  || — || September 28, 2000 || Kitt Peak || Spacewatch || MAS || align=right data-sort-value="0.78" | 780 m || 
|-id=842 bgcolor=#d6d6d6
| 312842 ||  || — || April 23, 2004 || Campo Imperatore || CINEOS || EOS || align=right | 2.3 km || 
|-id=843 bgcolor=#d6d6d6
| 312843 ||  || — || November 17, 1995 || Kitt Peak || Spacewatch || EOS || align=right | 2.8 km || 
|-id=844 bgcolor=#E9E9E9
| 312844 ||  || — || July 18, 2006 || Siding Spring || SSS || — || align=right | 2.3 km || 
|-id=845 bgcolor=#fefefe
| 312845 ||  || — || August 1, 2000 || Socorro || LINEAR || EUT || align=right data-sort-value="0.74" | 740 m || 
|-id=846 bgcolor=#E9E9E9
| 312846 ||  || — || March 11, 2005 || Mount Lemmon || Mount Lemmon Survey || — || align=right | 1.0 km || 
|-id=847 bgcolor=#d6d6d6
| 312847 ||  || — || March 29, 2003 || Anderson Mesa || LONEOS || — || align=right | 4.4 km || 
|-id=848 bgcolor=#d6d6d6
| 312848 ||  || — || November 19, 2006 || Kitt Peak || Spacewatch || — || align=right | 3.8 km || 
|-id=849 bgcolor=#E9E9E9
| 312849 ||  || — || January 15, 2004 || Kitt Peak || Spacewatch || — || align=right | 1.7 km || 
|-id=850 bgcolor=#d6d6d6
| 312850 ||  || — || September 1, 2005 || Palomar || NEAT || — || align=right | 5.8 km || 
|-id=851 bgcolor=#E9E9E9
| 312851 ||  || — || October 15, 2002 || Palomar || NEAT || — || align=right | 1.8 km || 
|-id=852 bgcolor=#fefefe
| 312852 ||  || — || December 18, 2004 || Mount Lemmon || Mount Lemmon Survey || FLO || align=right data-sort-value="0.74" | 740 m || 
|-id=853 bgcolor=#d6d6d6
| 312853 ||  || — || September 23, 2000 || Socorro || LINEAR || — || align=right | 4.1 km || 
|-id=854 bgcolor=#d6d6d6
| 312854 ||  || — || July 28, 2005 || Palomar || NEAT || — || align=right | 2.8 km || 
|-id=855 bgcolor=#fefefe
| 312855 ||  || — || May 7, 2010 || Mount Lemmon || Mount Lemmon Survey || — || align=right data-sort-value="0.94" | 940 m || 
|-id=856 bgcolor=#E9E9E9
| 312856 ||  || — || November 5, 2007 || Mount Lemmon || Mount Lemmon Survey || — || align=right | 1.6 km || 
|-id=857 bgcolor=#E9E9E9
| 312857 ||  || — || April 11, 2005 || Mount Lemmon || Mount Lemmon Survey || — || align=right | 1.4 km || 
|-id=858 bgcolor=#fefefe
| 312858 ||  || — || March 23, 2003 || Kitt Peak || Spacewatch || — || align=right data-sort-value="0.68" | 680 m || 
|-id=859 bgcolor=#fefefe
| 312859 ||  || — || December 14, 2004 || Socorro || LINEAR || FLO || align=right data-sort-value="0.81" | 810 m || 
|-id=860 bgcolor=#d6d6d6
| 312860 ||  || — || March 26, 2003 || Kitt Peak || Spacewatch || — || align=right | 2.9 km || 
|-id=861 bgcolor=#E9E9E9
| 312861 ||  || — || January 8, 2008 || Gaisberg || R. Gierlinger || — || align=right | 1.9 km || 
|-id=862 bgcolor=#E9E9E9
| 312862 ||  || — || December 5, 2007 || Kitt Peak || Spacewatch || PAD || align=right | 1.6 km || 
|-id=863 bgcolor=#E9E9E9
| 312863 ||  || — || October 11, 1977 || Palomar || PLS || — || align=right | 1.8 km || 
|-id=864 bgcolor=#fefefe
| 312864 ||  || — || September 19, 2001 || Socorro || LINEAR || — || align=right data-sort-value="0.76" | 760 m || 
|-id=865 bgcolor=#E9E9E9
| 312865 ||  || — || March 18, 2004 || Socorro || LINEAR || HOF || align=right | 3.6 km || 
|-id=866 bgcolor=#d6d6d6
| 312866 ||  || — || May 1, 2003 || Kitt Peak || Spacewatch || — || align=right | 3.2 km || 
|-id=867 bgcolor=#fefefe
| 312867 ||  || — || January 13, 2005 || Kitt Peak || Spacewatch || — || align=right | 1.0 km || 
|-id=868 bgcolor=#fefefe
| 312868 ||  || — || December 2, 2004 || Socorro || LINEAR || — || align=right data-sort-value="0.95" | 950 m || 
|-id=869 bgcolor=#E9E9E9
| 312869 ||  || — || April 2, 2005 || Kitt Peak || Spacewatch || — || align=right | 2.9 km || 
|-id=870 bgcolor=#d6d6d6
| 312870 ||  || — || October 20, 2001 || Palomar || NEAT || — || align=right | 2.8 km || 
|-id=871 bgcolor=#d6d6d6
| 312871 ||  || — || August 29, 2005 || Kitt Peak || Spacewatch || — || align=right | 2.7 km || 
|-id=872 bgcolor=#fefefe
| 312872 ||  || — || November 9, 2004 || Catalina || CSS || — || align=right data-sort-value="0.72" | 720 m || 
|-id=873 bgcolor=#E9E9E9
| 312873 ||  || — || October 11, 1977 || Palomar || PLS || — || align=right | 1.5 km || 
|-id=874 bgcolor=#fefefe
| 312874 ||  || — || October 7, 2004 || Palomar || NEAT || — || align=right | 1.2 km || 
|-id=875 bgcolor=#E9E9E9
| 312875 ||  || — || October 31, 2002 || Socorro || LINEAR || — || align=right | 2.4 km || 
|-id=876 bgcolor=#d6d6d6
| 312876 ||  || — || September 30, 2005 || Anderson Mesa || LONEOS || — || align=right | 3.6 km || 
|-id=877 bgcolor=#fefefe
| 312877 ||  || — || September 15, 1993 || La Silla || H. Debehogne, E. W. Elst || — || align=right data-sort-value="0.93" | 930 m || 
|-id=878 bgcolor=#d6d6d6
| 312878 ||  || — || October 10, 1999 || Socorro || LINEAR || — || align=right | 4.5 km || 
|-id=879 bgcolor=#E9E9E9
| 312879 ||  || — || December 30, 2007 || Mount Lemmon || Mount Lemmon Survey || — || align=right | 2.1 km || 
|-id=880 bgcolor=#d6d6d6
| 312880 ||  || — || March 10, 2002 || Kitt Peak || Spacewatch || — || align=right | 3.5 km || 
|-id=881 bgcolor=#E9E9E9
| 312881 ||  || — || August 19, 2006 || Kitt Peak || Spacewatch || — || align=right | 1.6 km || 
|-id=882 bgcolor=#d6d6d6
| 312882 ||  || — || April 8, 2008 || Catalina || CSS || — || align=right | 9.3 km || 
|-id=883 bgcolor=#d6d6d6
| 312883 ||  || — || January 21, 2008 || Mount Lemmon || Mount Lemmon Survey || — || align=right | 4.4 km || 
|-id=884 bgcolor=#E9E9E9
| 312884 ||  || — || July 29, 2002 || Palomar || NEAT || — || align=right | 1.0 km || 
|-id=885 bgcolor=#E9E9E9
| 312885 ||  || — || October 3, 2006 || Mount Lemmon || Mount Lemmon Survey || HOF || align=right | 3.8 km || 
|-id=886 bgcolor=#E9E9E9
| 312886 ||  || — || May 27, 2000 || Socorro || LINEAR || — || align=right | 3.8 km || 
|-id=887 bgcolor=#fefefe
| 312887 ||  || — || December 19, 2000 || Socorro || LINEAR || H || align=right | 1.1 km || 
|-id=888 bgcolor=#E9E9E9
| 312888 ||  || — || April 2, 2000 || Kitt Peak || Spacewatch || — || align=right | 1.9 km || 
|-id=889 bgcolor=#E9E9E9
| 312889 ||  || — || September 19, 2006 || Kitt Peak || Spacewatch || — || align=right | 2.3 km || 
|-id=890 bgcolor=#E9E9E9
| 312890 ||  || — || December 18, 2007 || Mount Lemmon || Mount Lemmon Survey || — || align=right | 2.7 km || 
|-id=891 bgcolor=#E9E9E9
| 312891 ||  || — || May 28, 2000 || Kitt Peak || Spacewatch || WIT || align=right | 1.3 km || 
|-id=892 bgcolor=#d6d6d6
| 312892 ||  || — || November 24, 2000 || Anderson Mesa || LONEOS || HYG || align=right | 3.4 km || 
|-id=893 bgcolor=#d6d6d6
| 312893 ||  || — || April 24, 2003 || Kitt Peak || Spacewatch || — || align=right | 3.4 km || 
|-id=894 bgcolor=#E9E9E9
| 312894 ||  || — || December 14, 2003 || Kitt Peak || Spacewatch || — || align=right | 1.5 km || 
|-id=895 bgcolor=#d6d6d6
| 312895 ||  || — || April 19, 1998 || Kitt Peak || Spacewatch || — || align=right | 3.4 km || 
|-id=896 bgcolor=#fefefe
| 312896 ||  || — || October 24, 2004 || Anderson Mesa || LONEOS || FLO || align=right data-sort-value="0.95" | 950 m || 
|-id=897 bgcolor=#d6d6d6
| 312897 ||  || — || May 13, 2005 || Mount Lemmon || Mount Lemmon Survey || — || align=right | 2.9 km || 
|-id=898 bgcolor=#E9E9E9
| 312898 ||  || — || February 16, 2004 || Kitt Peak || Spacewatch || XIZ || align=right | 1.5 km || 
|-id=899 bgcolor=#d6d6d6
| 312899 ||  || — || April 22, 2004 || Socorro || LINEAR || — || align=right | 4.8 km || 
|-id=900 bgcolor=#fefefe
| 312900 ||  || — || March 21, 2010 || Kitt Peak || Spacewatch || — || align=right data-sort-value="0.92" | 920 m || 
|}

312901–313000 

|-bgcolor=#E9E9E9
| 312901 ||  || — || February 5, 2000 || Kitt Peak || Spacewatch || — || align=right data-sort-value="0.88" | 880 m || 
|-id=902 bgcolor=#d6d6d6
| 312902 ||  || — || October 1, 2005 || Catalina || CSS || — || align=right | 3.9 km || 
|-id=903 bgcolor=#E9E9E9
| 312903 ||  || — || January 7, 2003 || Socorro || LINEAR || CLO || align=right | 2.4 km || 
|-id=904 bgcolor=#d6d6d6
| 312904 ||  || — || September 30, 2006 || Mount Lemmon || Mount Lemmon Survey || KOR || align=right | 1.7 km || 
|-id=905 bgcolor=#E9E9E9
| 312905 ||  || — || August 29, 2006 || Catalina || CSS || — || align=right | 2.3 km || 
|-id=906 bgcolor=#d6d6d6
| 312906 ||  || — || June 20, 1998 || Kitt Peak || Spacewatch || — || align=right | 3.9 km || 
|-id=907 bgcolor=#d6d6d6
| 312907 ||  || — || September 24, 1995 || Kitt Peak || Spacewatch || — || align=right | 2.8 km || 
|-id=908 bgcolor=#E9E9E9
| 312908 ||  || — || December 5, 2002 || Socorro || LINEAR || — || align=right | 3.3 km || 
|-id=909 bgcolor=#fefefe
| 312909 ||  || — || August 3, 2000 || Kitt Peak || Spacewatch || NYS || align=right data-sort-value="0.69" | 690 m || 
|-id=910 bgcolor=#fefefe
| 312910 ||  || — || June 9, 2007 || Catalina || CSS || NYS || align=right data-sort-value="0.82" | 820 m || 
|-id=911 bgcolor=#d6d6d6
| 312911 ||  || — || December 15, 2006 || Kitt Peak || Spacewatch || THM || align=right | 2.1 km || 
|-id=912 bgcolor=#d6d6d6
| 312912 ||  || — || November 18, 1995 || Kitt Peak || Spacewatch || — || align=right | 3.1 km || 
|-id=913 bgcolor=#d6d6d6
| 312913 ||  || — || October 29, 2005 || Mount Lemmon || Mount Lemmon Survey || — || align=right | 2.9 km || 
|-id=914 bgcolor=#d6d6d6
| 312914 ||  || — || January 14, 2002 || Palomar || NEAT || — || align=right | 4.4 km || 
|-id=915 bgcolor=#E9E9E9
| 312915 ||  || — || March 18, 2004 || Kitt Peak || Spacewatch || HEN || align=right | 1.3 km || 
|-id=916 bgcolor=#E9E9E9
| 312916 ||  || — || September 20, 2001 || Socorro || LINEAR || — || align=right | 2.5 km || 
|-id=917 bgcolor=#d6d6d6
| 312917 ||  || — || September 30, 2005 || Mount Lemmon || Mount Lemmon Survey || EOS || align=right | 2.2 km || 
|-id=918 bgcolor=#E9E9E9
| 312918 ||  || — || December 22, 1998 || Kitt Peak || Spacewatch || — || align=right | 2.5 km || 
|-id=919 bgcolor=#E9E9E9
| 312919 ||  || — || February 12, 2004 || Kitt Peak || Spacewatch || — || align=right | 1.8 km || 
|-id=920 bgcolor=#E9E9E9
| 312920 ||  || — || September 26, 1998 || Socorro || LINEAR || — || align=right | 1.5 km || 
|-id=921 bgcolor=#fefefe
| 312921 ||  || — || March 26, 2000 || Anderson Mesa || LONEOS || — || align=right data-sort-value="0.88" | 880 m || 
|-id=922 bgcolor=#E9E9E9
| 312922 ||  || — || December 18, 1995 || Kitt Peak || Spacewatch || — || align=right | 1.4 km || 
|-id=923 bgcolor=#d6d6d6
| 312923 ||  || — || February 13, 2002 || Kitt Peak || Spacewatch || — || align=right | 3.6 km || 
|-id=924 bgcolor=#d6d6d6
| 312924 ||  || — || December 25, 2006 || Kitt Peak || Spacewatch || — || align=right | 3.7 km || 
|-id=925 bgcolor=#E9E9E9
| 312925 ||  || — || May 9, 2005 || Catalina || CSS || — || align=right | 2.6 km || 
|-id=926 bgcolor=#fefefe
| 312926 ||  || — || April 24, 2006 || Kitt Peak || Spacewatch || — || align=right | 1.2 km || 
|-id=927 bgcolor=#E9E9E9
| 312927 ||  || — || April 7, 2005 || Mount Lemmon || Mount Lemmon Survey || — || align=right | 1.8 km || 
|-id=928 bgcolor=#d6d6d6
| 312928 ||  || — || January 29, 1998 || Kitt Peak || Spacewatch || K-2 || align=right | 1.7 km || 
|-id=929 bgcolor=#d6d6d6
| 312929 ||  || — || December 27, 2006 || Mount Lemmon || Mount Lemmon Survey || HYG || align=right | 2.5 km || 
|-id=930 bgcolor=#E9E9E9
| 312930 ||  || — || March 11, 2005 || Mount Lemmon || Mount Lemmon Survey || — || align=right | 1.2 km || 
|-id=931 bgcolor=#E9E9E9
| 312931 ||  || — || January 16, 2008 || Kitt Peak || Spacewatch || — || align=right | 2.2 km || 
|-id=932 bgcolor=#fefefe
| 312932 ||  || — || August 28, 2003 || Palomar || NEAT || V || align=right data-sort-value="0.83" | 830 m || 
|-id=933 bgcolor=#E9E9E9
| 312933 ||  || — || February 7, 1999 || Kitt Peak || Spacewatch || AST || align=right | 1.8 km || 
|-id=934 bgcolor=#fefefe
| 312934 ||  || — || November 27, 2000 || Socorro || LINEAR || — || align=right data-sort-value="0.88" | 880 m || 
|-id=935 bgcolor=#fefefe
| 312935 ||  || — || October 16, 1977 || Palomar || PLS || — || align=right data-sort-value="0.97" | 970 m || 
|-id=936 bgcolor=#fefefe
| 312936 ||  || — || June 25, 1979 || Siding Spring || E. F. Helin, S. J. Bus || — || align=right data-sort-value="0.89" | 890 m || 
|-id=937 bgcolor=#E9E9E9
| 312937 ||  || — || September 15, 1993 || La Silla || E. W. Elst || BRG || align=right | 2.3 km || 
|-id=938 bgcolor=#E9E9E9
| 312938 ||  || — || January 7, 1994 || Kitt Peak || Spacewatch || — || align=right | 2.1 km || 
|-id=939 bgcolor=#d6d6d6
| 312939 ||  || — || September 29, 1994 || Kitt Peak || Spacewatch || — || align=right | 3.7 km || 
|-id=940 bgcolor=#d6d6d6
| 312940 ||  || — || October 28, 1994 || Kitt Peak || Spacewatch || — || align=right | 3.1 km || 
|-id=941 bgcolor=#fefefe
| 312941 ||  || — || January 31, 1995 || Kitt Peak || Spacewatch || — || align=right data-sort-value="0.83" | 830 m || 
|-id=942 bgcolor=#FFC2E0
| 312942 ||  || — || March 7, 1995 || Oizumi || T. Kobayashi || APO +1km || align=right | 1.2 km || 
|-id=943 bgcolor=#E9E9E9
| 312943 ||  || — || March 2, 1995 || Kitt Peak || Spacewatch || — || align=right | 1.8 km || 
|-id=944 bgcolor=#E9E9E9
| 312944 ||  || — || March 26, 1995 || Kitt Peak || Spacewatch || — || align=right | 1.5 km || 
|-id=945 bgcolor=#E9E9E9
| 312945 ||  || — || March 29, 1995 || Kitt Peak || Spacewatch || — || align=right | 1.4 km || 
|-id=946 bgcolor=#d6d6d6
| 312946 ||  || — || September 18, 1995 || Kitt Peak || Spacewatch || — || align=right | 4.3 km || 
|-id=947 bgcolor=#fefefe
| 312947 ||  || — || September 26, 1995 || Kitt Peak || Spacewatch || MAS || align=right | 1.2 km || 
|-id=948 bgcolor=#C2FFFF
| 312948 ||  || — || September 26, 1995 || Kitt Peak || Spacewatch || L4 || align=right | 15 km || 
|-id=949 bgcolor=#fefefe
| 312949 ||  || — || October 28, 1995 || Kitt Peak || Spacewatch || NYS || align=right data-sort-value="0.83" | 830 m || 
|-id=950 bgcolor=#fefefe
| 312950 ||  || — || November 16, 1995 || Kitt Peak || Spacewatch || — || align=right data-sort-value="0.98" | 980 m || 
|-id=951 bgcolor=#d6d6d6
| 312951 ||  || — || December 18, 1995 || Kitt Peak || Spacewatch || — || align=right | 3.5 km || 
|-id=952 bgcolor=#d6d6d6
| 312952 ||  || — || January 12, 1996 || Kitt Peak || Spacewatch || — || align=right | 3.0 km || 
|-id=953 bgcolor=#E9E9E9
| 312953 ||  || — || January 21, 1996 || Kitt Peak || Spacewatch || — || align=right | 1.9 km || 
|-id=954 bgcolor=#E9E9E9
| 312954 ||  || — || April 11, 1996 || Kitt Peak || Spacewatch || — || align=right | 1.3 km || 
|-id=955 bgcolor=#C2FFFF
| 312955 ||  || — || September 15, 1996 || Kitt Peak || Spacewatch || L4 || align=right | 8.1 km || 
|-id=956 bgcolor=#FFC2E0
| 312956 ||  || — || February 2, 1997 || Kitt Peak || Spacewatch || APO || align=right data-sort-value="0.46" | 460 m || 
|-id=957 bgcolor=#d6d6d6
| 312957 ||  || — || May 6, 1997 || Kitt Peak || Spacewatch || — || align=right | 3.0 km || 
|-id=958 bgcolor=#FA8072
| 312958 ||  || — || August 30, 1997 || Haleakala || NEAT || — || align=right | 1.0 km || 
|-id=959 bgcolor=#E9E9E9
| 312959 ||  || — || September 27, 1997 || Kitt Peak || Spacewatch || — || align=right | 2.4 km || 
|-id=960 bgcolor=#E9E9E9
| 312960 ||  || — || September 27, 1997 || Kitt Peak || Spacewatch || HNS || align=right | 1.2 km || 
|-id=961 bgcolor=#C2FFFF
| 312961 ||  || — || September 30, 1997 || Kitt Peak || Spacewatch || L4 || align=right | 9.7 km || 
|-id=962 bgcolor=#C2FFFF
| 312962 ||  || — || September 30, 1997 || Kitt Peak || Spacewatch || L4 || align=right | 7.7 km || 
|-id=963 bgcolor=#E9E9E9
| 312963 ||  || — || December 21, 1997 || Kitt Peak || Spacewatch || — || align=right | 2.7 km || 
|-id=964 bgcolor=#fefefe
| 312964 ||  || — || February 23, 1998 || Kitt Peak || Spacewatch || NYS || align=right data-sort-value="0.90" | 900 m || 
|-id=965 bgcolor=#fefefe
| 312965 ||  || — || March 5, 1998 || Xinglong || SCAP || — || align=right data-sort-value="0.93" | 930 m || 
|-id=966 bgcolor=#fefefe
| 312966 ||  || — || April 22, 1998 || Kitt Peak || Spacewatch || — || align=right | 1.0 km || 
|-id=967 bgcolor=#d6d6d6
| 312967 ||  || — || August 23, 1998 || Xinglong || SCAP || HYG || align=right | 3.2 km || 
|-id=968 bgcolor=#d6d6d6
| 312968 ||  || — || August 24, 1998 || Socorro || LINEAR || EUP || align=right | 5.2 km || 
|-id=969 bgcolor=#E9E9E9
| 312969 ||  || — || September 26, 1998 || Socorro || LINEAR || — || align=right | 1.5 km || 
|-id=970 bgcolor=#E9E9E9
| 312970 ||  || — || September 26, 1998 || Socorro || LINEAR || — || align=right | 1.2 km || 
|-id=971 bgcolor=#E9E9E9
| 312971 ||  || — || November 15, 1998 || Gekko || T. Kagawa || — || align=right | 1.2 km || 
|-id=972 bgcolor=#E9E9E9
| 312972 || 1998 WO || — || November 17, 1998 || Cocoa || I. P. Griffin || JUN || align=right | 3.1 km || 
|-id=973 bgcolor=#E9E9E9
| 312973 ||  || — || January 19, 1999 || Caussols || ODAS || JUN || align=right | 1.2 km || 
|-id=974 bgcolor=#FA8072
| 312974 ||  || — || February 10, 1999 || Socorro || LINEAR || — || align=right | 1.1 km || 
|-id=975 bgcolor=#E9E9E9
| 312975 ||  || — || February 12, 1999 || Socorro || LINEAR || — || align=right | 2.1 km || 
|-id=976 bgcolor=#E9E9E9
| 312976 ||  || — || February 10, 1999 || Kitt Peak || Spacewatch || IAN || align=right | 1.5 km || 
|-id=977 bgcolor=#E9E9E9
| 312977 ||  || — || March 20, 1999 || Apache Point || SDSS || — || align=right | 2.2 km || 
|-id=978 bgcolor=#d6d6d6
| 312978 ||  || — || May 10, 1999 || Socorro || LINEAR || Tj (2.9) || align=right | 5.5 km || 
|-id=979 bgcolor=#FA8072
| 312979 ||  || — || May 18, 1999 || Socorro || LINEAR || — || align=right data-sort-value="0.84" | 840 m || 
|-id=980 bgcolor=#fefefe
| 312980 ||  || — || September 7, 1999 || Socorro || LINEAR || — || align=right | 1.8 km || 
|-id=981 bgcolor=#fefefe
| 312981 ||  || — || September 13, 1999 || Kitt Peak || Spacewatch || SUL || align=right | 2.3 km || 
|-id=982 bgcolor=#fefefe
| 312982 ||  || — || September 8, 1999 || Socorro || LINEAR || — || align=right | 1.4 km || 
|-id=983 bgcolor=#d6d6d6
| 312983 ||  || — || September 8, 1999 || Catalina || CSS || — || align=right | 3.3 km || 
|-id=984 bgcolor=#fefefe
| 312984 ||  || — || September 30, 1999 || Kitt Peak || Spacewatch || — || align=right | 1.1 km || 
|-id=985 bgcolor=#d6d6d6
| 312985 ||  || — || October 3, 1999 || Kitt Peak || Spacewatch || — || align=right | 3.9 km || 
|-id=986 bgcolor=#fefefe
| 312986 ||  || — || October 4, 1999 || Kitt Peak || Spacewatch || — || align=right data-sort-value="0.75" | 750 m || 
|-id=987 bgcolor=#d6d6d6
| 312987 ||  || — || October 7, 1999 || Kitt Peak || Spacewatch || EOS || align=right | 2.7 km || 
|-id=988 bgcolor=#fefefe
| 312988 ||  || — || October 8, 1999 || Kitt Peak || Spacewatch || — || align=right data-sort-value="0.82" | 820 m || 
|-id=989 bgcolor=#d6d6d6
| 312989 ||  || — || October 9, 1999 || Kitt Peak || Spacewatch || HYG || align=right | 3.8 km || 
|-id=990 bgcolor=#fefefe
| 312990 ||  || — || October 10, 1999 || Kitt Peak || Spacewatch || MAS || align=right | 1.00 km || 
|-id=991 bgcolor=#fefefe
| 312991 ||  || — || October 15, 1999 || Socorro || LINEAR || NYS || align=right | 1.1 km || 
|-id=992 bgcolor=#fefefe
| 312992 ||  || — || October 9, 1999 || Socorro || LINEAR || — || align=right | 1.0 km || 
|-id=993 bgcolor=#fefefe
| 312993 ||  || — || October 10, 1999 || Socorro || LINEAR || NYS || align=right data-sort-value="0.90" | 900 m || 
|-id=994 bgcolor=#fefefe
| 312994 ||  || — || October 10, 1999 || Socorro || LINEAR || — || align=right data-sort-value="0.98" | 980 m || 
|-id=995 bgcolor=#d6d6d6
| 312995 ||  || — || October 12, 1999 || Socorro || LINEAR || — || align=right | 4.1 km || 
|-id=996 bgcolor=#fefefe
| 312996 ||  || — || October 4, 1999 || Kitt Peak || Spacewatch || — || align=right data-sort-value="0.91" | 910 m || 
|-id=997 bgcolor=#fefefe
| 312997 ||  || — || October 7, 1999 || Catalina || CSS || NYS || align=right data-sort-value="0.86" | 860 m || 
|-id=998 bgcolor=#d6d6d6
| 312998 ||  || — || October 9, 1999 || Catalina || CSS || — || align=right | 4.1 km || 
|-id=999 bgcolor=#fefefe
| 312999 ||  || — || October 9, 1999 || Kitt Peak || Spacewatch || — || align=right data-sort-value="0.89" | 890 m || 
|-id=000 bgcolor=#d6d6d6
| 313000 ||  || — || October 15, 1999 || Kitt Peak || Spacewatch || — || align=right | 3.4 km || 
|}

References

External links 
 Discovery Circumstances: Numbered Minor Planets (310001)–(315000) (IAU Minor Planet Center)

0312